The first written records for the history of France appeared in the Iron Age. What is now France made up the bulk of the region known to the Romans as Gaul. Greek writers noted the presence of three main ethno-linguistic groups in the area: the Gauls, the Aquitani, and the Belgae. The Gauls, the largest and best attested group, were Celtic people speaking what is known as the Gaulish language.

Over the course of the first millennium BC the Greeks, Romans and Carthaginians established colonies on the Mediterranean coast and the offshore islands. The Roman Republic annexed southern Gaul as the province of Gallia Narbonensis in the late 2nd century BC, and Roman Legions under Julius Caesar conquered the rest of Gaul in the Gallic Wars of 58–51 BC. Afterwards a Gallo-Roman culture emerged and Gaul was increasingly integrated into the Roman Empire.

In the later stages of the Roman Empire, Gaul was subject to barbarian raids and migration, most importantly by the Germanic Franks. The Frankish king Clovis I united most of Gaul under his rule in the late 5th century, setting the stage for Frankish dominance in the region for hundreds of years. Frankish power reached its fullest extent under Charlemagne. The medieval Kingdom of France emerged from the western part of Charlemagne's Carolingian Empire, known as West Francia, and achieved increasing prominence under the rule of the House of Capet, founded by Hugh Capet in 987.

A succession crisis following the death of the last direct Capetian monarch in 1328 led to the series of conflicts known as the Hundred Years' War between the House of Valois and the House of Plantagenet. The war formally began in 1337 following Philip VI's attempt to seize the Duchy of Aquitaine from its hereditary holder, Edward III of England, the Plantagenet claimant to the French throne. Despite early Plantagenet victories, including the capture and ransom of John II of France, fortunes turned in favor of the Valois later in the war. Among the notable figures of the war was Joan of Arc, a French peasant girl who led French forces against the English, establishing herself as a national heroine. The war ended with a Valois victory in 1453.

Victory in the Hundred Years' War had the effect of strengthening French nationalism and vastly increasing the power and reach of the French monarchy. During the Ancien Régime period over the next centuries, France transformed into a centralized absolute monarchy through Renaissance and the Protestant Reformation. At the height of the French Wars of Religion, France became embroiled in another succession crisis, as the last Valois king, Henry III, fought against rival factions the House of Bourbon and the House of Guise. Henry, the Bourbon King of Navarre, won the conflict and established the Bourbon dynasty. A burgeoning worldwide colonial empire was established in the 16th century. The French monarchy's political power reached a zenith under the rule of Louis XIV, "The Sun King".

In the late 18th century the monarchy and associated institutions were overthrown in the French Revolution. The country was governed for a period as a Republic, until Napoleon Bonaparte's French Empire was declared. Following his defeat in the Napoleonic Wars, France went through several further regime changes, being ruled as a monarchy, then briefly as a Second Republic, and then as a Second Empire, until a more lasting French Third Republic was established in 1870.

France was one of the Triple Entente powers in World War I against Germany and the Central Powers. France was one of the Allied Powers in World War II, but was conquered by Nazi Germany in 1940. The Third Republic was dismantled, and most of the country was controlled directly by Germany while the south was controlled until 1942 by the collaborationist Vichy government. Living conditions were harsh as Germany drained away food and manpower, and many Jews were killed. The Free France movement took over the colonial empire, and coordinated the wartime Resistance. Following liberation in 1944, the Fourth Republic was established. France slowly recovered, and enjoyed a baby boom that reversed its very low fertility rate. Long wars in Indochina and Algeria drained French resources and ended in political defeat. In the wake of the 1958 Algerian Crisis, Charles de Gaulle set up the French Fifth Republic. Into the 1960s decolonization saw most of the French colonial empire become independent, while smaller parts were incorporated into the French state as overseas departments and collectivities. Since World War II France has been a permanent member in the UN Security Council and NATO. It played a central role in the unification process after 1945 that led to the European Union. Despite slow economic growth in recent years, it remains a strong economic, cultural, military and political factor in the 21st century.

Prehistory 

Stone tools discovered at Chilhac (1968) and Lézignan-la-Cèbe in 2009 indicate that pre-human ancestors may have been present in France at least 1.6 million years ago. Neanderthals were present in Europe from about 400,000 BC, but died out about 40,000 years ago, possibly out-competed by the modern humans during a period of cold weather. The earliest modern humans — Homo sapiens — entered Europe by 43,000 years ago (the Upper Palaeolithic). 

The Paleolithic cave paintings of Gargas (c. 25,000 BC) and Lascaux (c. 15,000 BC) as well as the Neolithic-era Carnac stones (c. 4500 BC) are among the many remains of local prehistoric activity in the region. In the Chalcolithic and Early Bronze Age the territory of France was largely dominated by the Bell Beaker culture, followed by the Armorican Tumulus culture, Rhône culture, Tumulus culture, Urnfield culture and Atlantic Bronze Age culture, among others. The Iron Age saw the development of the Hallstatt culture followed by the La Tène culture, the final cultural stage prior to Roman expansion across Gaul. The first written records for the history of France appear in the Iron Age. What is now France made up the bulk of the region known to the Romans as Gaul. Roman writers noted the presence of three main ethno-linguistic groups in the area: the Gauls, the Aquitani, and the Belgae. The Gauls, the largest and best attested group, were Celtic people speaking what is known as the Gaulish language.

Over the course of the 1st millennium BC the Greeks, Romans, and Carthaginians established colonies on the Mediterranean coast and the offshore islands. The Roman Republic annexed southern Gaul as the province of Gallia Narbonensis in the late 2nd century BC, and Roman forces under Julius Caesar conquered the rest of Gaul in the Gallic Wars of 58–51 BC. Afterwards a Gallo-Roman culture emerged and Gaul was increasingly integrated into the Roman empire.

Ancient history

Greek colonies 

In 600 BC, Ionian Greeks from Phocaea founded the colony of Massalia (present-day Marseille) on the shores of the Mediterranean Sea, making it one of the oldest cities in France. At the same time, some Celtic tribes arrived in the eastern parts (Germania superior) of the current territory of France, but this occupation spread in the rest of France only between the 5th and 3rd century BC.

Gaul 

Covering large parts of modern-day France, Belgium, northwest Germany and northern Italy, Gaul was inhabited by many Celtic and Belgae tribes whom the Romans referred to as Gauls and who spoke the Gaulish language roughly between the Oise and the Garonne (Gallia Celtica), according to Julius Caesar. On the lower Garonne the people spoke Aquitanian, a Pre-Indo-European language related to (or a direct ancestor of) Basque whereas a Belgian language was spoken north of Lutecia but north of the Loire according to other authors like Strabo. The Celts founded cities such as Lutetia Parisiorum (Paris) and Burdigala (Bordeaux) while the Aquitanians founded Tolosa (Toulouse).

Long before any Roman settlements, Greek navigators settled in what would become Provence. The Phoceans founded important cities such as Massalia (Marseille) and Nikaia (Nice), bringing them into conflict with the neighboring Celts and Ligurians. Some Phocean great navigators, such as Pytheas, were born in Marseille. The Celts themselves often fought with Aquitanians and Germans, and a Gaulish war band led by Brennus invaded Rome c. 393 or 388 BC following the Battle of the Allia.

However, the tribal society of the Gauls did not change fast enough for the centralized Roman state, who would learn to counter them. The Gaulish tribal confederacies were then defeated by the Romans in battles such as Sentinum and Telamon during the 3rd century BC. In the early 3rd century BC, some Belgae (Germani cisrhenani) conquered the surrounding territories of the Somme in northern Gaul after battles supposedly against the Armoricani (Gauls) near Ribemont-sur-Ancre and Gournay-sur-Aronde, where sanctuaries were found.

When Carthaginian commander Hannibal Barca fought the Romans, he recruited several Gaulish mercenaries who fought on his side at Cannae. It was this Gaulish participation that caused Provence to be annexed in 122 BC by the Roman Republic. Later, the Consul of Gaul — Julius Caesar — conquered all of Gaul. Despite Gaulish opposition led by Vercingetorix, the Gauls succumbed to the Roman onslaught. The Gauls had some success at first at Gergovia, but were ultimately defeated at Alesia in 52 BC. The Romans founded cities such as Lugdunum (Lyon), Narbonensis (Narbonne) and allow in a correspondence between Lucius Munatius Plancus and Cicero to formalize the existence of Cularo (Grenoble).

Roman Gaul 

Gaul was divided into several different provinces. The Romans displaced populations to prevent local identities from becoming a threat to Roman control. Thus, many Celts were displaced in Aquitania or were enslaved and moved out of Gaul. There was a strong cultural evolution in Gaul under the Roman Empire, the most obvious one being the replacement of the Gaulish language by Vulgar Latin. It has been argued the similarities between the Gaulish and Latin languages favoured the transition. Gaul remained under Roman control for centuries and Celtic culture was then gradually replaced by Gallo-Roman culture.

The Gauls became better integrated with the Empire with the passage of time. For instance, generals Marcus Antonius Primus and Gnaeus Julius Agricola were both born in Gaul, as were emperors Claudius and Caracalla. Emperor Antoninus Pius also came from a Gaulish family. In the decade following Valerian's capture by the Persians in 260, Postumus established a short-lived Gallic Empire, which included the Iberian Peninsula and Britannia, in addition to Gaul itself. Germanic tribes, the Franks and the Alamanni, entered Gaul at this time. The Gallic Empire ended with Emperor Aurelian's victory at Châlons in 274.

A migration of Celts appeared in the 4th century in Armorica. They were led by the legendary king Conan Meriadoc and came from Britain. They spoke the now extinct British language, which evolved into the Breton, Cornish, and Welsh languages.

In 418 the Aquitanian province was given to the Goths in exchange for their support against the Vandals. Those same Goths had sacked Rome in 410 and established a capital in Toulouse.

The Roman Empire had difficulty responding to all the barbarian raids, and Flavius Aëtius had to use these tribes against each other in order to maintain some Roman control. He first used the Huns against the Burgundians, and these mercenaries destroyed Worms, killed king Gunther, and pushed the Burgundians westward. The Burgundians were resettled by Aëtius near Lugdunum in 443. The Huns, united by Attila, became a greater threat, and Aëtius used the Visigoths against the Huns. The conflict climaxed in 451 at the Battle of Châlons, in which the Romans and Goths defeated Attila.

The Roman Empire was on the verge of collapsing. Aquitania was definitely abandoned to the Visigoths, who would soon conquer a significant part of southern Gaul as well as most of the Iberian Peninsula. The Burgundians claimed their own kingdom, and northern Gaul was practically abandoned to the Franks. Aside from the Germanic peoples, the Vascones entered Wasconia from the Pyrenees and the Bretons formed three kingdoms in Armorica: Domnonia, Cornouaille and Broërec.

Frankish kingdoms (486–987) 

In 486, Clovis I, leader of the Salian Franks, defeated Syagrius at Soissons and subsequently united most of northern and central Gaul under his rule. Clovis then recorded a succession of victories against other Germanic tribes such as the Alamanni at Tolbiac. In 496, pagan Clovis adopted Catholicism. This gave him greater legitimacy and power over his Christian subjects and granted him clerical support against the Arian Visigoths. He defeated Alaric II at Vouillé in 507 and annexed Aquitaine, and thus Toulouse, into his Frankish kingdom.

The Goths retired to Toledo in what would become Spain. Clovis made Paris his capital and established the Merovingian Dynasty but his kingdom would not survive his death in 511. Under Frankish inheritance traditions, all sons inherit part of the land, so four kingdoms emerged: centered on Paris, Orléans, Soissons, and Rheims. Over time, the borders and numbers of Frankish kingdoms were fluid and changed frequently. Also during this time, the Mayors of the Palace, originally the chief advisor to the kings, would become the real power in the Frankish lands; the Merovingian kings themselves would be reduced to little more than figureheads.

By this time Muslims had conquered Hispania and Septimania became part of the Al-Andalus, which were threatening the Frankish kingdoms. Duke Odo the Great defeated a major invading force at Toulouse in 721 but failed to repel a raiding party in 732. The mayor of the palace, Charles Martel, defeated that raiding party at the Battle of Tours and earned respect and power within the Frankish Kingdom. The assumption of the crown in 751 by Pepin the Short (son of Charles Martel) established the Carolingian dynasty as the Kings of the Franks.

Carolingian power reached its fullest extent under Pepin's son, Charlemagne. In 771, Charlemagne reunited the Frankish domains after a further period of division, subsequently conquering the Lombards under Desiderius in what is now northern Italy (774), incorporating Bavaria (788) into his realm, defeating the Avars of the Danubian plain (796), advancing the frontier with Al-Andalus as far south as Barcelona (801), and subjugating Lower Saxony after a prolonged campaign (804).

In recognition of his successes and his political support for the Papacy, Charlemagne was crowned Emperor of the Romans, or Roman Emperor in the West, by Pope Leo III in 800. Charlemagne's son Louis the Pious (emperor 814–840) kept the empire united; however, this Carolingian Empire would not survive Louis I's death. Two of his sons — Charles the Bald and Louis the German — swore allegiance to each other against their brother — Lothair I — in the Oaths of Strasbourg, and the empire was divided among Louis's three sons (Treaty of Verdun, 843). After a last brief reunification (884–887), the imperial title ceased to be held in the western realm, which was to form the basis of the future French kingdom. The eastern realm, which would become Germany, elected the Saxon dynasty of Henry the Fowler.

Under the Carolingians, the kingdom was ravaged by Viking raiders. In this struggle some important figures such as Count Odo of Paris and his brother King Robert rose to fame and became kings. This emerging dynasty, whose members were called the Robertines, were the predecessors of the Capetian Dynasty. Led by Rollo, some Vikings had settled in Normandy and were granted the land, first as counts and then as dukes, by King Charles the Simple, in order to protect the land from other raiders. The people that emerged from the interactions between the new Viking aristocracy and the already mixed Franks and Gallo-Romans became known as the Normans.

State building into the Kingdom of France (987–1453)

Kings during this period 
Capetian Dynasty (House of Capet):
Hugh Capet, 940–996
Robert the Pious, 996–1027
Henry I, 1027–60
Philip I, 1060–1108
Louis VI the Fat, 1108–37
Louis VII the Young, 1137–80
Philip II Augustus, 1180–1223
Louis VIII the Lion, 1223–26
Saint Louis IX, 1226–70
Philip III the Bold, 1270–85
Philip IV the Fair, 1285–1314
Louis X the Quarreller, 1314–16
John I the Posthumous, five days in 1316
Philip V the Tall, 1316–22
Charles IV the Fair, 1322–28
House of Valois:
Philip VI of Valois, 1328–50
John II the Good, 1350–64
Charles V the Wise, 1364–80
Charles VI the Mad, 1380–1422
English interlude (between Charles VI and VII):
Henry V of England
Henry VI of England and France
Charles VII the Well Served, 1422–61

Strong princes 
France was a very decentralised state during the Middle Ages. The authority of the king was more religious than administrative. The 11th century in France marked the apogee of princely power at the expense of the king when states like Normandy, Flanders or Languedoc enjoyed a local authority comparable to kingdoms in all but name. The Capetians, as they were descended from the Robertians, were formerly powerful princes themselves who had successfully unseated the weak and unfortunate Carolingian kings.

The Carolingian kings had nothing more than a royal title when the Capetian kings added their principality to that title. The Capetians, in a way, held a dual status of King and Prince; as king they held the Crown of Charlemagne and as Count of Paris they held their personal fiefdom, best known as Île-de-France.

The fact that the Capetians held lands as both Prince and King gave them a complicated status. They were involved in the struggle for power within France as princes, but they also had a religious authority over Roman Catholicism in France as King. The Capetian kings treated other princes more as enemies and allies than as subordinates: their royal title was recognised yet frequently disrespected. Capetian authority was so weak in some remote places that bandits were the effective power.

Some of the king's vassals would grow sufficiently powerful that they would become some of the strongest rulers of western Europe. The Normans, the Plantagenets, the Lusignans, the Hautevilles, the Ramnulfids, and the House of Toulouse successfully carved lands outside France for themselves. The most important of these conquests for French history was the Norman Conquest by William the Conqueror, following the Battle of Hastings and immortalised in the Bayeux Tapestry, because it linked England to France through Normandy. Although the Normans were now both vassals of the French kings and their equals as kings of England, their zone of political activity remained centered in France.

An important part of the French aristocracy also involved itself in the crusades, and French knights founded and ruled the Crusader states. An example of the legacy left in the Middle East by these nobles is the Krak des Chevaliers' enlargement by the Counts of Tripoli and Toulouse.

Rise of the monarchy 
The monarchy overcame the powerful barons over ensuing centuries, and established absolute sovereignty over France in the 16th century. A number of factors contributed to the rise of the French monarchy. The dynasty established by Hugh Capet continued uninterrupted until 1328, and the laws of primogeniture ensured orderly successions of power. Secondly, the successors of Capet came to be recognised as members of an illustrious and ancient royal house and therefore socially superior to their politically and economically superior rivals. Thirdly, the Capetians had the support of the Church, which favoured a strong central government in France. This alliance with the Church was one of the great enduring legacies of the Capetians. The First Crusade was composed almost entirely of Frankish Princes. As time went on, the power of the King was expanded by conquests, seizures and successful feudal political battles.

The history of France starts with the election of Hugh Capet (940–996) by an assembly summoned in Reims in 987. Capet had been "Duke of the Franks" and then became "King of the Franks" (Rex Francorum). Hugh's lands extended little beyond the Paris basin; his political unimportance weighed against the powerful barons who elected him. Many of the king's vassals (who included for a long time the kings of England) ruled over territories far greater than his own. He was recorded to be recognised king by the Gauls, Bretons, Danes, Aquitanians, Goths, Spanish and Gascons.

Count Borell of Barcelona called for Hugh's help against Islamic raids, but even if Hugh intended to help Borell, he was otherwise occupied in fighting Charles of Lorraine. The loss of other Spanish principalities then followed, as the Spanish marches grew more and more independent. Hugh Capet, the first Capetian king, is not a well documented figure, his greatest achievement being certainly to survive as king and defeating the Carolingian claimant, thus allowing him to establish what would become one of Europe's most powerful house of kings.

Hugh's son—Robert the Pious—was crowned King of the Franks before Capet's demise. Hugh Capet decided so in order to have his succession secured. Robert II, as King of the Franks, met Emperor Henry II in 1023 on the borderline. They agreed to end all claims over each other's realm, setting a new stage of Capetian and Ottonian relationships. Although a king weak in power, Robert II's efforts were considerable. His surviving charters imply he relied heavily on the Church to rule France, much like his father did. Although he lived with a mistress—Bertha of Burgundy—and was excommunicated because of this, he was regarded as a model of piety for monks (hence his nickname, Robert the Pious). The reign of Robert II was quite important because it involved the Peace and Truce of God (beginning in 989) and the Cluniac Reforms.

Under King Philip I, the kingdom enjoyed a modest recovery during his extraordinarily long reign (1060–1108). His reign also saw the launch of the First Crusade to regain the Holy Land, which heavily involved his family although he personally did not support the expedition.

It is from Louis VI (reigned 1108–37) onward that royal authority became more accepted. Louis VI was more a soldier and warmongering king than a scholar. The way the king raised money from his vassals made him quite unpopular; he was described as greedy and ambitious and that is corroborated by records of the time. His regular attacks on his vassals, although damaging the royal image, reinforced the royal power. From 1127 onward Louis had the assistance of a skilled religious statesman, Abbot Suger. The abbot was the son of a minor family of knights, but his political advice was extremely valuable to the king. Louis VI successfully defeated, both military and politically, many of the robber barons. Louis VI frequently summoned his vassals to the court, and those who did not show up often had their land possessions confiscated and military campaigns mounted against them. This drastic policy clearly imposed some royal authority on Paris and its surrounding areas. When Louis VI died in 1137, much progress had been made towards strengthening Capetian authority.

Thanks to Abbot Suger's political advice, King Louis VII (junior king 1131–37, senior king 1137–80) enjoyed greater moral authority over France than his predecessors. Powerful vassals paid homage to the French king. Abbot Suger arranged the 1137 marriage between Louis VII and Eleanor of Aquitaine in Bordeaux, which made Louis VII Duke of Aquitaine and gave him considerable power. However, the couple disagreed over the burning of more than a thousand people in Vitry during the conflict against the Count of Champagne.

King Louis VII was deeply horrified by the event and sought penitence by going to the Holy Land. He later involved the Kingdom of France in the Second Crusade but his relationship with Eleanor did not improve. The marriage was ultimately annulled by the pope and Eleanor soon married the Duke of Normandy — Henry Fitzempress, who would become King of England as Henry II two years later. Louis VII was once a very powerful monarch and was now facing a much stronger vassal, who was his equal as King of England and his strongest prince as Duke of Normandy and Aquitaine.

Abbot Suger's vision of construction became what is now known as Gothic architecture. This style became standard for most European cathedrals built in the late Middle Ages.

Late Capetians (1165–1328) 
The late direct Capetian kings were considerably more powerful and influential than the earliest ones. While Philip I could hardly control his Parisian barons, Philip IV could dictate popes and emperors. The late Capetians, although they often ruled for a shorter time than their earlier peers, were often much more influential. This period also saw the rise of a complex system of international alliances and conflicts opposing, through dynasties, Kings of France and England and Holy Roman Emperor.

Philip II Augustus 
The reign of Philip II Augustus (junior king 1179–80, senior king 1180–1223) marked an important step in the history of French monarchy. His reign saw the French royal domain and influence greatly expanded. He set the context for the rise of power to much more powerful monarchs like Saint Louis and Philip the Fair.

Philip II spent an important part of his reign fighting the so-called Angevin Empire, which was probably the greatest threat to the King of France since the rise of the Capetian dynasty. During the first part of his reign Philip II tried using Henry II of England's son against him. He allied himself with the Duke of Aquitaine and son of Henry II—Richard Lionheart—and together they launched a decisive attack on Henry's castle and home of Chinon and removed him from power.

Richard replaced his father as King of England afterward. The two kings then went crusading during the Third Crusade; however, their alliance and friendship broke down during the crusade. The two men were once again at odds and fought each other in France until Richard was on the verge of totally defeating Philip II.

Adding to their battles in France, the Kings of France and England were trying to install their respective allies at the head of the Holy Roman Empire. If Philip II Augustus supported Philip of Swabia, member of the House of Hohenstaufen, then Richard Lionheart supported Otto IV, member of the House of Welf. Otto IV had the upper hand and became the Holy Roman Emperor at the expense of Philip of Swabia. The crown of France was saved by Richard's demise after a wound he received fighting his own vassals in Limousin.

John Lackland, Richard's successor, refused to come to the French court for a trial against the Lusignans and, as Louis VI had done often to his rebellious vassals, Philip II confiscated John's possessions in France. John's defeat was swift and his attempts to reconquer his French possession at the decisive Battle of Bouvines (1214) resulted in complete failure. Philip II had annexed Normandy and Anjou, plus capturing the Counts of Boulogne and Flanders, although Aquitaine and Gascony remained loyal to the Plantagenet King. In an additional aftermath of the Battle of Bouvines, John's ally Holy Roman Emperor Otto IV was overthrown by Frederick II, member of the House of Hohenstaufen and ally of Philip. Philip II of France was crucial in ordering Western European politics in both England and France.

Philip Augustus founded the Sorbonne and made Paris a city for scholars.

Prince Louis (the future Louis VIII, reigned 1223–26) was involved in the subsequent English civil war as French and English (or rather Anglo-Norman) aristocracies were once one and were now split between allegiances. While the French kings were struggling against the Plantagenets, the Church called for the Albigensian Crusade. Southern France was then largely absorbed in the royal domains.

Saint Louis (1226–1270) 
France became a truly centralised kingdom under Louis IX (reigned 1226–70). Saint Louis has often been portrayed as a one-dimensional character, a flawless example of the faith and an administrative reformer who cared for the governed. However, his reign was far from perfect for everyone: he made unsuccessful crusades, his expanding administrations raised opposition, and he burned Jewish books at the Pope's urging. Louis had a strong sense of justice and always wanted to judge people himself before applying any sentence. This was said about Louis and French clergy asking for excommunications of Louis' vassals:

Louis IX was only twelve years old when he became King of France. His mother — Blanche of Castile — was the effective power as regent (although she did not formally use the title). Blanche's authority was strongly opposed by the French barons yet she maintained her position until Louis was old enough to rule by himself.

In 1229, the King had to struggle with a long lasting strike at the University of Paris. The Quartier Latin was strongly hit by these strikes.

The kingdom was vulnerable: war was still going on in the County of Toulouse, and the royal army was occupied fighting resistance in Languedoc. Count Raymond VII of Toulouse finally signed the Treaty of Paris in 1229, in which he retained much of his lands for life, but his daughter, married to Count Alfonso of Poitou, produced him no heir and so the County of Toulouse went to the King of France.

King Henry III of England had not yet recognized the Capetian overlordship over Aquitaine and still hoped to recover Normandy and Anjou and reform the Angevin Empire. He landed in 1230 at Saint-Malo with a massive force. Henry III's allies in Brittany and Normandy fell down because they did not dare fight their king, who led the counterstrike himself. This evolved into the Saintonge War (1242).

Ultimately, Henry III was defeated and had to recognise Louis IX's overlordship, although the King of France did not seize Aquitaine from Henry III. Louis IX was now the most important landowner of France, adding to his royal title. There were some opposition to his rule in Normandy, yet it proved remarkably easy to rule, especially compared to the County of Toulouse which had been brutally conquered. The Conseil du Roi, which would evolve into the Parlement, was founded in these times. After his conflict with King Henry III of England, Louis established a cordial relation with the Plantagenet King.

Saint Louis also supported new forms of art such as Gothic architecture; his Sainte-Chapelle became a very famous gothic building, and he is also credited for the Morgan Bible. The Kingdom was involved in two crusades under Saint Louis: the Seventh Crusade and the Eighth Crusade. Both proved to be complete failures for the French King.

Philip III and Philip IV (1270–1314) 
Philip III became king when Saint Louis died in 1270 during the Eighth Crusade. Philip III was called "the Bold" on the basis of his abilities in combat and on horseback, and not because of his character or ruling abilities. Philip III took part in another crusading disaster: the Aragonese Crusade, which cost him his life in 1285.

More administrative reforms were made by Philip IV, also called Philip the Fair (reigned 1285–1314). This king was responsible for the end of the Knights Templar, signed the Auld Alliance, and established the Parlement of Paris. Philip IV was so powerful that he could name popes and emperors, unlike the early Capetians. The papacy was moved to Avignon and all the contemporary popes were French, such as Philip IV's puppet Bertrand de Goth, Pope Clement V.

Early Valois Kings and the Hundred Years' War (1328–1453) 

The tensions between the Houses of Plantagenet and Capet climaxed during the so-called Hundred Years' War (actually several distinct wars over the period 1337 to 1453) when the Plantagenets claimed the throne of France from the Valois. This was also the time of the Black Death, as well as several civil wars. The French population suffered much from these wars. In 1420, by the Treaty of Troyes Henry V was made heir to Charles VI. Henry V failed to outlive Charles so it was Henry VI of England and France who consolidated the Dual-Monarchy of England and France.

It has been argued that the difficult conditions the French population suffered during the Hundred Years' War awakened French nationalism, a nationalism represented by Joan of Arc (1412–1431). Although this is debatable, the Hundred Years' War is remembered more as a Franco-English war than as a succession of feudal struggles. During this war, France evolved politically and militarily.

Although a Franco-Scottish army was successful at the Battle of Baugé (1421), the humiliating defeats of Poitiers (1356) and Agincourt (1415) forced the French nobility to realise they could not stand just as armoured knights without an organised army. Charles VII (reigned 1422–61) established the first French standing army, the Compagnies d'ordonnance, and defeated the Plantagenets once at Patay (1429) and again, using cannons, at Formigny (1450). The Battle of Castillon (1453) was the last engagement of this war; Calais and the Channel Islands remained ruled by the Plantagenets.

Early Modern France (1453–1789)

Kings during this period 
The Early Modern period in French history spans the following reigns, from 1461 to the Revolution, breaking in 1789:

 House of Valois
 Louis XI the Prudent, 1461–83
 Charles VIII the Affable, 1483–98
 Louis XII, 1498–1515
 Francis I, 1515–47
 Henry II, 1547–59
 Francis II, 1559–60
 Charles IX, 1560–74 (1560–63 under regency of Catherine de' Medici)
 Henry III, 1574–89
 House of Bourbon
 Henry IV the Great, 1589–1610
 the Regency of Marie de Medici, 1610–17
 Louis XIII the Just and his minister Cardinal Richelieu, 1610–43
 the Regency of Anne of Austria and her minister Cardinal Mazarin, 1643–51
 Louis XIV the Sun King and his minister Jean-Baptiste Colbert, 1643–1715
 the Régence, a period of regency under Philip II of Orléans, 1715–23
 Louis XV the Beloved and his minister Cardinal André-Hercule de Fleury, 1715–74
 Louis XVI, 1774–92

Life in the Early Modern period

French identity 
This land supported 13 million people in 1484 and 20 million people in 1700. France had the second largest population in Europe around 1700. Britain had 5 million, Spain had 8 million, and the Austrian Habsburgs had around 8 million. Russia was the most populated European country at the time. France's lead slowly faded after 1700, as other countries grew faster.

The sense of "being French" was uncommon in 1500, as people clung to their local identities. By 1600, however, people were starting to call themselves "bon françois."

Estates and power 
Political power was widely dispersed. The law courts ("Parlements") were powerful, especially that of France. However, the king had only about 10,000 officials in royal service – very few indeed for such a large country, and with very slow internal communications over an inadequate road system. Travel was usually faster by ocean ship or river boat. The different estates of the realm — the clergy, the nobility, and commoners — occasionally met together in the "Estates General", but in practice the Estates General had no power, for it could petition the king but could not pass laws.

The Catholic Church controlled about 40% of the wealth, tied up in long-term endowments that could be added to but not reduced. The king (not the pope) nominated bishops, but typically had to negotiate with noble families that had close ties to local monasteries and church establishments.

The nobility came second in terms of wealth, but there was no unity. Each noble had his own lands, his own network of regional connections, and his own military force.

The cities had a quasi-independent status, and were largely controlled by the leading merchants and guilds. Paris was by far the largest city with 220,000 people in 1547 and a history of steady growth. Lyon and Rouen each had about 40,000 population, but Lyon had a powerful banking community, a vibrant culture and good access to the Mediterranean Sea. Bordeaux was next with only 20,000 population in 1500.

Peasants made up the vast majority of population, who in many cases had well-established rights that the authorities had to respect. In 1484, about 97% of France's 13 million people lived in rural villages; in 1700, at least 80% of the 20 million people population were peasants.

In the 17th century peasants had ties to the market economy, provided much of the capital investment necessary for agricultural growth, and frequently moved from village to village (or town). Geographic mobility, directly tied to the market and the need for investment capital, was the main path to social mobility. The "stable" core of French society, town guildspeople and village labourers, included cases of staggering social and geographic continuity, but even this core required regular renewal.

Accepting the existence of these two societies, the constant tension between them, and extensive geographic and social mobility tied to a market economy holds the key to a clearer understanding of the evolution of the social structure, economy, and even political system of early modern France. The Annales School paradigm underestimated the role of the market economy; failed to explain the nature of capital investment in the rural economy; and grossly exaggerated social stability.

Language 

Although most peasants in France spoke local dialects, an official language emerged in Paris and the French language became the preferred language of Europe's aristocracy and the lingua franca of diplomacy and international relations. Holy Roman Emperor Charles V (1500-1558) quipped, "I speak Spanish to God, Italian to women, French to men, and German to my horse."

Because of its international status, there was a desire to regulate the French language. Several reforms of the French language worked to make it more uniform. The Renaissance writer François Rabelais (? - 1553) helped to shape French as a literary language, Rabelais' French is characterised by the re-introduction of Greek and Latin words. Jacques Peletier du Mans (1517-1582) was one of the scholars who reformed the French language. He improved Nicolas Chuquet's long scale system by adding names for intermediate numbers ("milliards" instead of "thousand million", etc.).

Consolidation (15th and 16th centuries) 

With the death in 1477 of Charles the Bold, France and the Habsburgs began a long process of dividing his rich Burgundian lands, leading to numerous wars. In 1532, Brittany was incorporated into the Kingdom of France.

France engaged in the long Italian Wars (1494–1559), which marked the beginning of early modern France. Francis I faced powerful foes, and he was captured at Pavia. The French monarchy then sought for allies and found one in the Ottoman Empire. The Ottoman Admiral Barbarossa captured Nice in 1543 and handed it down to Francis I.

During the 16th century, the Spanish and Austrian Habsburgs were the dominant power in Europe. The many domains of Charles V encircled France. The Spanish Tercio was used with great success against French knights. Finally, on 7 January 1558, the Duke of Guise seized Calais from the English.

«Beautiful 16th century» 
Economic historians call the era from about 1475 to 1630 the «beautiful 16th century» because of the return of peace, prosperity and optimism across the nation, and the steady growth of population. Paris, for example, flourished as never before, as its population rose to 200,000 by 1550. In Toulouse the Renaissance of the 16th century brought wealth that transformed the architecture of the town, such as building of the great aristocratic houses. In 1559, Henri II of France signed (with the approval of Ferdinand I, Holy Roman Emperor) two treaties (Peace of Cateau-Cambrésis): one with Elizabeth I of England and one with Philip II of Spain. This ended long-lasting conflicts between France, England and Spain.

Protestant Huguenots and wars of religion (1562–1629) 

The Protestant Reformation, inspired in France mainly by John Calvin, began to challenge the legitimacy and rituals of the Catholic Church. It reached an elite audience.

Calvin, based securely in Geneva, Switzerland, was a Frenchman deeply committed to reforming his homeland. The Protestant movement had been energetic, but lacked central organizational direction. With financial support from the church in Geneva, Calvin turned his enormous energies toward uplifting the French Protestant cause. As one historian explains:
He supplied the dogma, the liturgy, and the moral ideas of the new religion, and he also created ecclesiastical, political, and social institutions in harmony with it. A born leader, he followed up his work with personal appeals. His vast correspondence with French Protestants shows not only much zeal but infinite pains and considerable tact and driving home the lessons of his printed treatises.

Between 1555 and 1562, more than 100 ministers were sent to France. Nevertheless, French King Henry II severely persecuted Protestants under the Edict of Chateaubriand (1551) and when the French authorities complained about the missionary activities, the city fathers of Geneva disclaimed official responsibility. The two main Calvinist strongholds were southwest France and Normandy, but even in these districts the Catholics were a majority. Renewed Catholic reaction — headed by the powerful Francis, Duke of Guise — led to a massacre of Huguenots at Vassy in 1562, starting the first of the French Wars of Religion, during which English, German, and Spanish forces intervened on the side of rival Protestant ("Huguenot") and Catholic forces.

King Henry II died in 1559 in a jousting tournament; he was succeeded in turn by his three sons, each of which assumed the throne as minors or were weak, ineffectual rulers. In the power vacuum entered Henry's widow, Catherine de' Medici, who became a central figure in the early years of the Wars of Religion. She is often blamed for the St. Bartholomew's Day massacre of 1572, when thousands of Huguenots were murdered in Paris and the provinces of France.

The Wars of Religion culminated in the War of the Three Henrys (1584–98), at the height of which bodyguards of the King Henry III assassinated Henry de Guise, leader of the Spanish-backed Catholic league, in December 1588. In revenge, a priest assassinated Henry III in 1589. This led to the ascension of the Huguenot Henry IV; in order to bring peace to a country beset by religious and succession wars, he converted to Catholicism. "Paris is worth a Mass," he reputedly said. He issued the Edict of Nantes in 1598, which guaranteed religious liberties to the Protestants, thereby effectively ending the civil war. The main provisions of the Edict of Nantes were as follows: a) Huguenots were allowed to hold religious services in certain towns in each province, b) They were allowed to control and fortify eight cities (including La Rochelle and Montauban), c) Special courts were established to try Huguenot offenders, d) Huguenots were to have equal civil rights with the Catholics.
Henry IV was assassinated in 1610 by a fanatical Catholic.

When in 1620 the Huguenots proclaimed a constitution for the 'Republic of the Reformed Churches of France', the chief minister Cardinal Richelieu (1585–1642) invoked the entire powers of the state to stop it. Religious conflicts therefore resumed under Louis XIII when Richelieu forced Protestants to disarm their army and fortresses. This conflict ended in the Siege of La Rochelle (1627–28), in which Protestants and their English supporters were defeated. The following Peace of Alais (1629) confirmed religious freedom yet dismantled the Protestant military defences.

In the face of persecution, Huguenots dispersed widely throughout Protestant kingdoms in Europe and America.

Thirty Years' War (1618–1648) 

The religious conflicts that plagued France also ravaged the Habsburg-led Holy Roman Empire. The Thirty Years' War eroded the power of the Catholic Habsburgs. Although Cardinal Richelieu, the powerful chief minister of France, had mauled the Protestants, he joined this war on their side in 1636 because it was in the national interest. Imperial Habsburg forces invaded France, ravaged Champagne, and nearly threatened Paris.

Richelieu died in 1642 and was succeeded by Cardinal Mazarin, while Louis XIII died one year later and was succeeded by Louis XIV. France was served by some very efficient commanders such as Louis II de Bourbon, Prince de Condé and Henri de la Tour d'Auvergne, Vicomte de Turenne. The French forces won a decisive victory at Rocroi (1643), and the Spanish army was decimated; the Tercio was broken. The Truce of Ulm (1647) and the Peace of Westphalia (1648) brought an end to the war.

Some challenges remained. France was hit by civil unrest known as The Fronde which in turn evolved into the Franco-Spanish War in 1653. Louis II de Bourbon joined the Spanish army this time, but suffered a severe defeat at Dunkirk (1658) by Henry de la Tour d'Auvergne. The terms for the peace inflicted upon the Spanish kingdoms in the Treaty of the Pyrenees (1659) were harsh, as France annexed Northern Catalonia.

Amidst this turmoil, René Descartes sought answers to philosophical questions through the use of logic and reason and formulated what would be called Cartesian Dualism in 1641.

Colonies (16th and 17th centuries) 

During the 16th century, the king began to claim North American territories and established several colonies. Jacques Cartier was one of the great explorers who ventured deep into American territories during the 16th century.

The early 17th century saw the first successful French settlements in the New World with the voyages of Samuel de Champlain. The largest settlement was New France, with the towns of Quebec City (1608) and Montreal (fur trading post in 1611, Roman Catholic mission established in 1639, and colony founded in 1642).

Louis XIV (1643–1715) 

Louis XIV, known as the "Sun King", reigned over France from 1643 until 1715 although his strongest period of personal rule did not begin until 1661 after the death of his Italian chief minister Cardinal Mazarin. Louis believed in the divine right of kings, which asserts that a monarch is above everyone except God, and is therefore not answerable to the will of his people, the aristocracy, or the Church. Louis continued his predecessors' work of creating a centralized state governed from Paris, sought to eliminate remnants of feudalism in France, and subjugated and weakened the aristocracy. By these means he consolidated a system of absolute monarchical rule in France that endured until the French Revolution. However, Louis XIV's long reign saw France involved in many wars that drained its treasury.

His reign began during the Thirty Years' War and during the Franco-Spanish war. His military architect, Vauban, became famous for his pentagonal fortresses, and Jean-Baptiste Colbert supported the royal spending as much as possible. French dominated League of the Rhine fought against the Ottoman Turks at the Battle of Saint Gotthard in 1664. The battle was won by the Christians, chiefly through the brave attack of 6,000 French troops led by La Feuillade and Coligny.

France fought the War of Devolution against Spain in 1667. France's defeat of Spain and invasion of the Spanish Netherlands alarmed England and Sweden. With the Dutch Republic they formed the Triple Alliance to check Louis XIV's expansion. Louis II de Bourbon had captured Franche-Comté, but in face of an indefensible position, Louis XIV agreed to the peace of Aachen. Under its terms, Louis XIV did not annex Franche-Comté but did gain Lille.

Peace was fragile, and war broke out again between France and the Dutch Republic in the Franco-Dutch War (1672–78). Louis XIV asked for the Dutch Republic to resume war against the Spanish Netherlands, but the republic refused. France attacked the Dutch Republic and was joined by England in this conflict. Through targeted inundations of polders by breaking dykes, the French invasion of the Dutch Republic was brought to a halt. The Dutch Admiral Michiel de Ruyter inflicted a few strategic defeats on the Anglo-French naval alliance and forced England to retire from the war in 1674. Because the Netherlands could not resist indefinitely, it agreed to peace in the Treaties of Nijmegen, according to which France would annex France-Comté and acquire further concessions in the Spanish Netherlands.

On 6 May 1682, the royal court moved to the lavish Palace of Versailles, which Louis XIV had greatly expanded. Over time, Louis XIV compelled many members of the nobility, especially the noble elite, to inhabit Versailles. He controlled the nobility with an elaborate system of pensions and privileges, and replaced their power with himself.

Peace did not last, and war between France and Spain again resumed. The War of the Reunions broke out (1683–84), and again Spain, with its ally the Holy Roman Empire, was defeated. Meanwhile, in October 1685 Louis signed the Edict of Fontainebleau ordering the destruction of all Protestant churches and schools in France. Its immediate consequence was a large Protestant exodus from France. Over two million people died in two famines in 1693 and 1710.

France would soon be involved in another war, the War of the Grand Alliance. This time the theatre was not only in Europe but also in North America. Although the war was long and difficult (it was also called the Nine Years' War), its results were inconclusive. The Treaty of Ryswick in 1697 confirmed French sovereignty over Alsace, yet rejected its claims to Luxembourg. Louis also had to evacuate Catalonia and the Palatinate. This peace was considered a truce by all sides, thus war was to start again.

In 1701, the War of the Spanish Succession began. The Bourbon Philip of Anjou was designated heir to the throne of Spain as Philip V. The Habsburg Emperor Leopold opposed a Bourbon succession, because the power that such a succession would bring to the Bourbon rulers of France would disturb the delicate balance of power in Europe. Therefore, he claimed the Spanish thrones for himself. England and the Dutch Republic joined Leopold against Louis XIV and Philip of Anjou. The allied forces were led by John Churchill, 1st Duke of Marlborough, and by Prince Eugene of Savoy. They inflicted a few resounding defeats on the French army; the Battle of Blenheim in 1704 was the first major land battle lost by France since its victory at Rocroi in 1643. Yet, the extremely bloody battles of Ramillies (1706) and Malplaquet (1709) proved to be Pyrrhic victories for the allies, as they had lost too many men to continue the war. Led by Villars, French forces recovered much of the lost ground in battles such as Denain (1712). Finally, a compromise was achieved with the Treaty of Utrecht in 1713. Philip of Anjou was confirmed as Philip V, king of Spain; Emperor Leopold did not get the throne, but Philip V was barred from inheriting France.

Louis XIV wanted to be remembered as a patron of the arts, like his ancestor Louis IX. He invited Jean-Baptiste Lully to establish the French opera, and a tumultuous friendship was established between Lully and playwright and actor Molière. Jules Hardouin Mansart became France's most important architect of the period, bringing the pinnacle of French Baroque architecture.

The wars were so expensive, and so inconclusive, that although France gained some territory to the east, its enemies gained more strength than it did. Vauban, France's leading military strategist, warned the King in 1689 that a hostile "Alliance" was too powerful at sea. He recommended the best way for France to fight back was to license French merchants ships to privateer and seize enemy merchant ships, while avoiding its navies:

Vauban was pessimistic about France's so-called friends and allies and recommended against expensive land wars, or hopeless naval wars:

Major changes in France, Europe, and North America (1718–1783) 

Louis XIV died in 1715 and was succeeded by his five-year-old great grandson who reigned as Louis XV until his death in 1774. In 1718, France was once again at war, as Philip II of Orléans's regency joined the War of the Quadruple Alliance against Spain. King Philip V of Spain had to withdraw from the conflict, confronted with the reality that Spain was no longer a great power in Europe. Under Cardinal Fleury's administration, peace was maintained as long as possible.

However, in 1733 another war broke in central Europe, this time about the Polish succession, and France joined the war against the Austrian Empire. This time there was no invasion of the Netherlands, and Britain remained neutral. As a consequence, Austria was left alone against a Franco-Spanish alliance and faced a military disaster. Peace was settled in the Treaty of Vienna (1738), according to which France would annex, through inheritance, the Duchy of Lorraine.

Two years later, in 1740, war broke out over the Austrian succession, and France seized the opportunity to join the conflict. The war played out in North America and India as well as Europe, and inconclusive terms were agreed to in the Treaty of Aix-la-Chapelle (1748). Once again, no one regarded this as a peace, but rather as a mere truce. Prussia was then becoming a new threat, as it had gained substantial territory from Austria. This led to the Diplomatic Revolution of 1756, in which the alliances seen during the previous war were mostly inverted. France was now allied to Austria and Russia, while Britain was now allied to Prussia.

In the North American theatre, France was allied with various Native American peoples during the Seven Years' War and, despite a temporary success at the battles of the Great Meadows and Monongahela, French forces were defeated at the disastrous Battle of the Plains of Abraham in Quebec. In Europe, repeated French attempts to overwhelm Hanover failed. In 1762, Russia, France, and Austria were on the verge of crushing Prussia, when the Anglo-Prussian Alliance was saved by the Miracle of the House of Brandenburg. At sea, naval defeats against British fleets at Lagos and Quiberon Bay in 1759 and a crippling blockade forced France to keep its ships in port. Finally peace was concluded in the Treaty of Paris (1763), and France lost its North American empire.

Britain's success in the Seven Years' War had allowed them to eclipse France as the leading colonial power. France sought revenge for this defeat, and under Choiseul France started to rebuild. In 1766, the French Kingdom annexed Lorraine and the following year bought Corsica from Genoa.

Having lost its colonial empire, France saw a good opportunity for revenge against Britain in signing an alliance with the Americans in 1778, and sending an army and navy that turned the American Revolution into a world war. Spain, allied to France by the Family Compact, and the Dutch Republic also joined the war on the French side. Admiral de Grasse defeated a British fleet at Chesapeake Bay while Jean-Baptiste Donatien de Vimeur, comte de Rochambeau and Gilbert du Motier, Marquis de Lafayette joined American forces in defeating the British at Yorktown. The war was concluded by the Treaty of Paris (1783); the United States became independent. The British Royal Navy scored a major victory over France in 1782 at the Battle of the Saintes and France finished the war with huge debts and the minor gain of the island of Tobago.

French Enlightenment 

The "Philosophes" were 18th-century French intellectuals who dominated the French Enlightenment and were influential across Europe. Their interests were diverse, with experts in scientific, literary, philosophical and sociological matters. The ultimate goal of the philosophers was human progress; by concentrating on social and material sciences, they believed that a rational society was the only logical outcome of a freethinking and reasoned populace. They also advocated Deism and religious tolerance. Many believed religion had been used as a source of conflict since time eternal, and that logical, rational thought was the way forward for mankind.

The philosopher Denis Diderot was editor in chief of the famous Enlightenment accomplishment, the 72,000-article Encyclopédie (1751–72). It was made possible through a wide, complex network of relationships that maximized their influence. It sparked a revolution in learning throughout the enlightened world.

In the early part of the 18th century the movement was dominated by Voltaire and Montesquieu, but the movement grew in momentum as the century moved on. The opposition was partly undermined by dissensions within the Catholic Church, the gradual weakening of the absolute monarch and the numerous expensive wars. Thus the influence of the Philosophes spread. Around 1750 they reached their most influential period, as Montesquieu published Spirit of Laws (1748) and Jean Jacques Rousseau published Discourse on the Moral Effects of the Arts and Sciences (1750).

The leader of the French Enlightenment and a writer of enormous influence across Europe, was Voltaire (1694–1778). His many books included poems and plays; works of satire (Candide [1759]); books on history, science, and philosophy, including numerous (anonymous) contributions to the Encyclopédie; and an extensive correspondence. A witty, tireless antagonist to the alliance between the French state and the church, he was exiled from France on a number of occasions. In exile in England he came to appreciate British thought and he popularized Isaac Newton in Europe.

Astronomy, chemistry, mathematics and technology flourished. French chemists such as Antoine Lavoisier worked to replace the archaic units of weights and measures by a coherent scientific system. Lavoisier also formulated the law of Conservation of mass and discovered oxygen and hydrogen.

Revolutionary France (1789–1799)

Background of the French Revolution 

When King Louis XV died in 1774 he left his grandson, Louis XVI, "A heavy legacy, with ruined finances, unhappy subjects, and a faulty and incompetent government." Regardless, "the people, meanwhile, still had confidence in royalty, and the accession of Louis XVI was welcomed with enthusiasm."

A decade later, recent wars, especially the Seven Years' War (1756–63) and the American Revolutionary War (1775–83), had effectively bankrupted the state. The taxation system was highly inefficient. Several years of bad harvests and an inadequate transportation system had caused rising food prices, hunger, and malnutrition; the country was further destabilized by the lower classes' increased feeling that the royal court was isolated from, and indifferent to, their hardships.

In February 1787, the king's finance minister, Charles Alexandre de Calonne, convened an Assembly of Notables, a group of nobles, clergy, bourgeoisie, and bureaucrats selected in order to bypass the local parliaments. This group was asked to approve a new land tax that would, for the first time, include a tax on the property of nobles and clergy. The assembly did not approve the tax, and instead demanded that Louis XVI call the Estates-General.

National Assembly, Paris anarchy and storming the Bastille (January – 14 July 1789) 
In August 1788, the King agreed to convene the Estates-General in May 1789. While the Third Estate demanded and was granted "double representation" so as to balance the First and Second Estate, voting was to occur "by orders" – votes of the Third Estate were to be weighted – effectively canceling double representation. This eventually led to the Third Estate breaking away from the Estates-General and, joined by members of the other estates, proclaiming the creation of the National Assembly, an assembly not of the Estates but of "the People".

In an attempt to keep control of the process and prevent the Assembly from convening, Louis XVI ordered the closure of the Salle des États where the Assembly met. After finding the door to their chamber locked and guarded, the Assembly met nearby on a tennis court and pledged the Tennis Court Oath on 20 June 1789, binding them "never to separate, and to meet wherever circumstances demand, until the constitution of the kingdom is established and affirmed on solid foundations". They were joined by some sympathetic members of the Second and First estates. After the king fired his finance minister, Jacques Necker, for giving his support and guidance to the Third Estate, worries surfaced that the legitimacy of the newly formed National Assembly might be threatened by royalists.

Paris was soon consumed with riots and widespread looting. Because the royal leadership essentially abandoned the city, the mobs soon had the support of the French Guard, including arms and trained soldiers. On 14 July 1789, the insurgents set their eyes on the large weapons and ammunition cache inside the Bastille fortress, which also served as a symbol of royal tyranny. Insurgents seized the Bastille prison, killing the governor and several of his guards. The French now celebrate 14 July each year as 'Bastille day' or, as the French say: Quatorze Juillet (the Fourteenth of July), as a symbol of the shift away from the Ancien Régime to a more modern, democratic state.

Violence against aristocracy and abolition of feudalism (15 July – August 1789) 
Gilbert du Motier, Marquis de Lafayette, a hero of the American War of Independence, on 15 July took command of the National Guard, and the king on 17 July accepted to wear the two-colour cockade (blue and red), later adapted into the tricolour cockade, as the new symbol of revolutionary France.

Although peace was made, several nobles did not regard the new order as acceptable and emigrated in order to push the neighboring, aristocratic kingdoms to war against the new regime. The state was now struck for several weeks in July and August 1789 by violence against aristocracy, also called 'the Great Fear'.

On 4 and 11 August 1789, the National Constituent Assembly abolished privileges and feudalism, sweeping away personal serfdom, exclusive hunting rights and other seigneurial rights of the Second Estate (nobility). The tithe was also abolished which had been the main source of income for many clergymen.

The Declaration of the Rights of Man and of the Citizen was adopted by the National Assembly on 27 August 1789, as a first step in their effort to write a constitution. Considered to be a precursor to modern international rights instruments and using the U.S. Declaration of Independence as a model, it defined a set of individual rights and collective rights of all of the estates as one. Influenced by the doctrine of natural rights, these rights were deemed universal and valid in all times and places, pertaining to human nature itself. The Assembly also replaced France's historic provinces with eighty-three departments, uniformly administered and approximately equal to one another in extent and population.

Curtailment of Church powers (October 1789 – December 1790) 

When a mob from Paris attacked the royal palace at Versailles in October 1789 seeking redress for their severe poverty, the royal family was forced to move to the Tuileries Palace in Paris.

Under the Ancien Régime, the Roman Catholic Church had been the largest landowner in the country. In November 1789, the Assembly decided to nationalize and sell all church property, thus in part addressing the financial crisis.

In July 1790, the Assembly adopted the Civil Constitution of the Clergy. This law reorganized the French Catholic Church, arranged that henceforth the salaries of the priests would be paid by the state, abolished the Church's authority to levy a tax on crops and again cancelled some privileges for the clergy. In October a group of 30 bishops wrote a declaration saying they could not accept the law, and this fueled civilian opposition against it. The Assembly then in late November 1790 decreed that all clergy should take an oath of loyalty to the Civil Constitution of the Clergy. This stiffened the resistance, especially in the west of France including Normandy, Brittany and the Vendée, where few priests took the oath and the civilian population turned against the revolution. Priests swearing the oath were designated 'constitutional', and those not taking the oath as 'non-juring' or 'refractory' clergy.

Making a constitutional monarchy (June–September 1791) 
In June 1791, the royal family secretly fled Paris in disguise for Varennes near France's northeastern border in order to seek royalist support the king believed he could trust, but they were soon discovered en route. They were brought back to Paris, after which they were essentially kept under house arrest at the Tuileries.

In August 1791, Emperor Leopold II of Austria and King Frederick William II of Prussia in the Declaration of Pillnitz declared their intention to bring the French king in a position "to consolidate the basis of a monarchical government", and that they were preparing their own troops for action. Instead of cowing the French, this infuriated them, and they militarised the borders.

With most of the Assembly still favoring a constitutional monarchy rather than a republic, the various groups reached a compromise. Under the Constitution of 3 September 1791, France would function as a constitutional monarchy with Louis XVI as little more than a figurehead. The King had to share power with the elected Legislative Assembly, although he still retained his royal veto and the ability to select ministers. He had perforce to swear an oath to the constitution, and a decree declared that retracting the oath, heading an army for the purpose of making war upon the nation or permitting anyone to do so in his name would amount to de facto abdication.

War and internal uprisings (October 1791 – August 1792) 

On 1 October 1791, the Legislative Assembly was formed, elected by those 4 million men – out of a population of 25 million – who paid a certain minimum amount of taxes. A group of Assembly members who propagated war against Austria and Prussia was, after a remark by politician Maximilien Robespierre, henceforth designated the 'Girondins', although not all of them really came from the southern province of Gironde. A group around Robespierre – later called 'Montagnards' or 'Jacobins' – pleaded against war; this opposition between those groups would harden and become bitter in the next  years.

In response to the threat of war of August 1791 from Austria and Prussia, leaders of the Assembly saw such a war as a means to strengthen support for their revolutionary government, and the French people as well as the Assembly thought that they would win a war against Austria and Prussia. On 20 April 1792, France declared war on Austria. Late April 1792, France invaded and conquered the Austrian Netherlands (roughly present-day Belgium and Luxembourg).

Nevertheless, in the summer of 1792, all of Paris was against the king, and hoped that the Assembly would depose the king, but the Assembly hesitated. At dawn of 10 August 1792, a large, angry crowd of Parisians and soldiers from all over France marched on the Tuileries Palace where the king resided. Around 8:00am the king decided to leave his palace and seek safety with his wife and children in the Assembly that was gathered in permanent session in Salle du Manège opposite to the Tuileries. After 11:00am, the Assembly 'temporarily relieved the king from his task'. In reaction, on 19 August an army under Prussian general Duke of Brunswick invaded France and besieged Longwy. Late August 1792, elections were held, now under male universal suffrage, for the new National Convention. On 26 August, the Assembly decreed the deportation of refractory priests in the west of France, as "causes of danger to the fatherland", to destinations like French Guiana. In reaction, peasants in the Vendée took over a town, in another step toward civil war.

Bloodbath in Paris and the Republic established (September 1792) 

On 2, 3 and 4 September 1792, some three hundred volunteers and supporters of the revolution, infuriated by Verdun being captured by the Prussian enemy, and rumours that the foreign enemy were conspiring with the incarcerated prisoners in Paris, raided the Parisian prisons. Jean-Paul Marat had called for preemptive action and between 1,200 and 1,400 prisoners were murdered within 20 hours (September Massacres), many of them Catholic nonjuring priests but also aristocrats, forgers and common criminals. In an open letter on 3 September the radical Marat incited the rest of France to follow the Parisian example. Danton and Robespierre kept a low profile in regard to the murder orgy. The Assembly and the city council of Paris (la Commune) seemed inapt and hardly motivated to call a halt to the unleashed bloodshed.

On 20 September 1792, the French won a battle against Prussian troops near Valmy and the new National Convention replaced the Legislative Assembly. From the start the Convention suffered from the bitter division between a group around Robespierre, Danton and Marat referred to as 'Montagnards' or 'Jacobins' or 'left' and a group referred to as 'Girondins' or 'right'. But the majority of the representatives, referred to as 'la Plaine', were member of neither of those two antagonistic groups and managed to preserve some speed in the convention's debates. Right away on 21 September the Convention abolished the monarchy, making France the French First Republic. A new French Republican Calendar was introduced to replace the Christian Gregorian calendar, renaming the year 1792 as year 1 of the Republic.

War and civil war (November 1792 – spring 1793) 

With wars against Prussia and Austria having started earlier in 1792, in November France also declared war on the Kingdom of Great Britain and the Dutch Republic. Ex-king Louis XVI was tried, convicted, and guillotined in January 1793.

Introduction of a nationwide conscription for the army in February 1793 was the spark that in March made the Vendée, already rebellious since 1790 because of the Civil Constitution of the Clergy, ignite into civil war against Paris. Meanwhile, France in March also declared war on Spain. That month, the Vendée rebels won some victories against Paris and the French army was defeated in Belgium by Austria with the French general Dumouriez defecting to the Austrians: the French Republic's survival was now in real danger.

That month the 'Girondins' group indicted Jean-Paul Marat before the Revolutionary Tribunal for 'attempting to destroy the sovereignty of the people' and 'preaching plunder and massacre', referring to his behaviour during the September 1792 Paris massacres. Marat was quickly acquitted but the incident further acerbated the 'Girondins' versus 'Montagnards' party strife in the convention.
In the spring of 1793, Austrian, British, Dutch and Spanish troops invaded France.

Showdown in the Convention (May–June 1793) 

With rivalry, even enmity, in the National Convention and its predecessors between so-called 'Montagnards' and 'Girondins' smouldering ever since late 1791, Jacques Hébert, Convention member leaning to the 'Montagnards' group, on 24 May 1793 called on the sans-culottes—the idealized simple, non-aristocratic, hard-working, upright, patriotic, republican, Paris labourers—to rise in revolt against the "henchmen of Capet [=the killed ex-king] and Dumouriez [=the defected general]". Hébert was arrested immediately by a Convention committee investigating Paris rebelliousness. The convention's President Isnard, a Girondin, answered them: "Members of la Commune ... If by your incessant rebellions something befalls to the representatives of the nation, I declare, in the name of France, that Paris will be totally obliterated".

On 29 May 1793, in Lyon an uprising overthrew a group of Montagnards ruling the city; Marseille, Toulon and more cities saw similar events.

On 2 June 1793, the convention's session in Tuileries Palace—since early May their venue—not for the first time degenerated into chaos and pandemonium. This time crowds of people including 80,000 armed soldiers swarmed in and around the palace. Incessant screaming from the public galleries, always in favour of the Montagnards, suggested that all of Paris was against the Girondins, which was not really the case. Petitions circulated, indicting and condemning 22 Girondins. Barère, member of the Committee of Public Safety, suggested: to end this division which is harming the Republic, the Girondin leaders should lay down their offices voluntarily. A decree was adopted that day by the convention, after much tumultuous debate, expelling 22 leading Girondins from the convention. Late that night, indeed dozens of Girondins had resigned and left the convention.

In the course of 1793, the Holy Roman Empire, the kings of Portugal and Naples and the Grand-Duke of Tuscany declared war against France.

Counter-revolution subdued (July 1793 – April 1794) 

By the summer of 1793, most French departments in one way or another opposed the central Paris government, and in many cases 'Girondins', fled from Paris after 2 June, led those revolts. In Brittany's countryside, the people rejecting the Civil Constitution of the Clergy of 1790 had taken to a guerrilla warfare known as Chouannerie. But generally, the French opposition against 'Paris' had now evolved into a plain struggle for power over the country against the 'Montagnards' around Robespierre and Marat now dominating Paris.

In June–July 1793, Bordeaux, Marseilles, Brittany, Caen and the rest of Normandy gathered armies to march on Paris and against 'the revolution'. In July, Lyon guillotined the deposed 'Montagnard' head of the city council. Barère, member of the Committee of Public Safety, on 1 August incited the convention to tougher measures against the Vendée, at war with Paris since March: "We'll have peace only when no Vendée remains ... we'll have to exterminate that rebellious people". In August, Convention troops besieged Lyon.

In August–September 1793, militants urged the convention to do more to quell the counter-revolution. Bertrand Barère, member of the Committee of Public Safety—the de facto executive government—ever since April 1793, among others on 5 September reacted favorably, saying: let's "make terror the order of the day!" On 17 September, the National Convention passed the Law of Suspects, a decree ordering the arrest of all declared opponents of the current form of government and suspected "enemies of freedom". This decree was one of the causes for 17,000 death sentences until the end of July 1794, reason for historians to label those  months 'the (Reign of) Terror'.

On 19 September the Vendée rebels again defeated a Republican Convention army. On 1 October Barère repeated his plea to subdue the Vendée: "refuge of fanaticism, where priests have raised their altars". In October the Convention troops captured Lyon and reinstated a Montagnard government there.

Criteria for bringing someone before the Revolutionary Tribunal, created March 1793, had always been vast and vague. By August, political disagreement seemed enough to be summoned before the Tribunal; appeal against a Tribunal verdict was impossible. Late August 1793, an army general had been guillotined on the accusation of choosing too timid strategies on the battlefield. Mid-October, the widowed former queen Marie Antoinette was on trial for a long list of charges such as "teaching [her husband] Louis Capet the art of dissimulation" and incest with her son, she too was guillotined. In October, 21 former 'Girondins' Convention members who had not left Paris after June were convicted to death and executed, on the charge of verbally supporting the preparation of an insurrection in Caen by fellow-Girondins.

On 17 October 1793, the 'blue' Republican army near Cholet defeated the 'white' Vendéan insubordinate army and all surviving Vendée residents, counting in tens of thousands, fled over the river Loire north into Brittany. A Convention's representative on mission in Nantes commissioned in October to pacify the region did so by simply drowning prisoners in the river Loire: until February 1794 he drowned at least 4,000. By November 1793, the revolts in Normandy, Bordeaux and Lyon were overcome, in December also that in Toulon. Two representatives on mission sent to punish Lyon between November 1793 and April 1794 executed 2,000 people by guillotine or firing-squad. The Vendéan army since October roaming through Brittany on 12 December 1793 again ran up against Republican troops and saw 10,000 of its rebels perish, meaning the end of this once threatening army. Some historians claim that after that defeat Convention Republic armies in 1794 massacred 117,000 Vendéan civilians to obliterate the Vendéan people, but others contest that claim. Some historians consider the civil war to have lasted until 1796 with a toll of 450,000 lives.

Death-sentencing politicians (February–July 1794) 

Maximilien Robespierre, since July 1793 member of the Committee of Public Prosperity, on 5 February 1794 in a speech in the Convention identified Jacques Hébert and his faction as "internal enemies" working toward the triumph of tyranny. After a dubious trial Hébert and some allies were guillotined in March. On 5 April, again at the instigation of Robespierre, Danton and 13 associated politicians were executed. A week later again 19 politicians. This hushed the Convention deputies: if henceforth they disagreed with Robespierre they hardly dared to speak out. A law enacted on 10 June 1794 (22 Prairial II) further streamlined criminal procedures: if the Revolutionary Tribunal saw sufficient proof of someone being an "enemy of the people" a counsel for defence would not be allowed. The frequency of guillotine executions in Paris now rose from on average three a day to an average of 29 a day.

Meanwhile, France's external wars were going well, with victories over Austrian and British troops in May and June 1794 opening up Belgium for French conquest. However, cooperation within the Committee of Public Safety, since April 1793 the de facto executive government, started to break down. On 29 June 1794, three colleagues of Robespierre at the Committee called him a dictator in his face; Robespierre, baffled, left the meeting. This encouraged other Convention members to also defy Robespierre. On 26 July, a long and vague speech of Robespierre was not met with thunderous applause as usual but with hostility; some deputies yelled that Robespierre should have the courage to say which deputies he deemed necessary to be killed next, which Robespierre refused to do.

In the Convention session of 27 July 1794, Robespierre and his allies hardly managed to say a word as they were constantly interrupted by a row of critics such as Tallien, Billaud-Varenne, Vadier, Barère and acting president Thuriot. Finally, even Robespierre's own voice failed on him: it faltered at his last attempt to beg permission to speak. A decree was adopted to arrest Robespierre, Saint-Just and Couthon. On 28 July, they and 19 others were beheaded. On 29 July, again 70 Parisians were guillotined. Subsequently, the Law of 22 Prairial (10 June 1794) was repealed, and the 'Girondins' expelled from the Convention in June 1793, if not dead yet, were reinstated as Convention deputies.

Disregarding the working classes (August 1794 – October 1795) 
After July 1794, most civilians henceforth ignored the Republican calendar and returned to the traditional seven-day weeks. The government in a law of 21 February 1795 set steps of return to freedom of religion and reconciliation with the since 1790 refractory Catholic priests, but any religious signs outside churches or private homes, such as crosses, clerical garb, bell ringing, remained prohibited. When the people's enthusiasm for attending church grew to unexpected levels the government backed out and in October 1795 again, like in 1790, required all priests to swear oaths on the Republic.

In the very cold winter of 1794–95, with the French army demanding more and more bread, the same was getting scarce in Paris, as was wood to keep houses warm, and in an echo of the October 1789 March on Versailles, on 1 April 1795 (12 Germinal III) a mostly female crowd marched on the Convention calling for bread. But no Convention member sympathized; they just told the women to return home. Again in May a crowd of 20,000 men and 40,000 women invaded the convention and even killed a deputy in the halls, but again they failed to make the Convention take notice of the needs of the lower classes. Instead, the Convention banned women from all political assemblies, and deputies who had solidarized with this insurrection were sentenced to death: such allegiance between parliament and street fighting was no longer tolerated.

Late 1794, France conquered present-day Belgium. In January 1795 they subdued the Dutch Republic with full consent and cooperation of the influential Dutch  ('patriots' movement'), resulting in the Batavian Republic, a satellite and puppet state of France. In April 1795, France concluded a peace agreement with Prussia; later that year peace was agreed with Spain.

Fighting Catholicism and royalism (October 1795 – November 1799) 
In October 1795, the Republic was reorganised, replacing the one-chamber parliament (the National Convention) by a bi-cameral system: the first chamber called the 'Council of 500' initiating the laws, the second the 'Council of Elders' reviewing and approving or not the passed laws. Each year, one-third of the chambers was to be renewed. The executive power lay with five directors – hence the name 'Directory' for this form of government – with a five-year mandate, each year one of them being replaced. The early directors did not much understand the nation they were governing; they especially had an innate inability to see Catholicism as anything other than counter-revolutionary and royalist. Local administrators had a better sense of people's priorities, and one of them wrote to the minister of the interior: "Give back the crosses, the church bells, the Sundays, and everyone will cry: '

French armies in 1796 advanced into Germany, Austria and Italy. In 1797, France conquered the Rhineland, Belgium and much of Italy, and unsuccessfully attacked Wales.

Parliamentary elections in the spring of 1797 resulted in considerable gains for the royalists. This frightened the republican directors and they staged a coup d'état on 4 September 1797 (Coup of 18 Fructidor V) to remove two supposedly pro-royalist directors and some prominent royalists from both Councils.
The new, 'corrected' government, still strongly convinced that Catholicism and royalism were equally dangerous to the Republic, started a fresh campaign to promote the Republican calendar officially introduced in 1792, with its ten-day week, and tried to hallow the tenth day, as substitute for the Christian Sunday. Not only citizens opposed and even mocked such decrees, also local government officials refused to enforce such laws.

France was still waging wars, in 1798 in Egypt, Switzerland, Rome, Ireland, Belgium and against the U.S.A., in 1799 in Baden-Württemberg. In 1799, when the French armies abroad experienced some setbacks, the newly chosen director Sieyes considered a new overhaul necessary for the Directory's form of government because in his opinion it needed a stronger executive. Together with successful general Napoleon Bonaparte who had just returned to France, Sieyes began preparing another coup d'état, which took place on 9–10 November 1799 (18–19 Brumaire VIII), replacing the five directors now with three "consuls": Napoleon, Sieyes, and Roger Ducos.

Napoleonic France (1799–1815) 

During the War of the First Coalition (1792–1797), the Directory had replaced the National Convention. Five directors then ruled France. As Great Britain was still at war with France, a plan was made to take Egypt from the Ottoman Empire, a British ally. This was Napoleon's idea and the Directory agreed to the plan in order to send the popular general away from the mainland. Napoleon defeated the Ottoman forces during the Battle of the Pyramids (21 July 1798) and sent hundreds of scientists and linguists out to thoroughly explore modern and ancient Egypt. Only a few weeks later the British fleet under Admiral Horatio Nelson unexpectedly destroyed the French fleet at the Battle of the Nile (1–3 August 1798). Napoleon planned to move into Syria but was defeated at the Siege of Acre and he returned to France without his army, which surrendered.

The Directory was threatened by the Second Coalition (1798–1802). Royalists and their allies still dreamed of restoring the monarchy to power, while the Prussian and Austrian crowns did not accept their territorial losses during the previous war. In 1799, the Russian army expelled the French from Italy in battles such as Cassano, while the Austrian army defeated the French in Switzerland at Stockach and Zurich. Napoleon then seized power through a coup and established the Consulate in 1799. The Austrian army was defeated at the Battle of Marengo (1800) and again at the Battle of Hohenlinden (1800).

While at sea the French had some success at Boulogne but Nelson's Royal Navy destroyed an anchored Danish and Norwegian fleet at the Battle of Copenhagen (1801) because the Scandinavian kingdoms were against the British blockade of France. The Second Coalition was beaten and peace was settled in two distinct treaties: the Treaty of Lunéville and the Treaty of Amiens. A brief interlude of peace ensued in 1802–03, during which Napoleon sold French Louisiana to the United States because it was indefensible.

In 1801, Napoleon concluded a "Concordat" with Pope Pius VII that opened peaceful relations between church and state in France. The policies of the Revolution were reversed, except the Church did not get its lands back. Bishops and clergy were to receive state salaries, and the government would pay for the building and maintenance of churches. Napoleon reorganized higher learning by dividing the  into four (later five) academies.

In 1804, Napoleon was titled Emperor by the senate, thus founding the First French Empire. Napoleon's rule was constitutional, and although autocratic, it was much more advanced than traditional European monarchies of the time. The proclamation of the French Empire was met by the Third Coalition. The French army was renamed  in 1805 and Napoleon used propaganda and nationalism to control the French population. The French army achieved a resounding victory at Ulm (16–19 October 1805), where an entire Austrian army was captured.

A Franco-Spanish fleet was defeated at Trafalgar (21 October 1805) and all plans to invade Britain were then made impossible. Despite this naval defeat, it was on land that this war would be won; Napoleon inflicted on the Austrian and Russian Empires one of their greatest defeats at Austerlitz (also known as the "Battle of the Three Emperors" on 2 December 1805), destroying the Third Coalition. Peace was settled in the Treaty of Pressburg; the Austrian Empire lost the title of Holy Roman Emperor and the Confederation of the Rhine was created by Napoleon over former Austrian territories.

Coalitions formed against Napoleon 
Prussia joined Britain and Russia, thus forming the Fourth Coalition. Although the Coalition was joined by other allies, the French Empire was also not alone since it now had a complex network of allies and subject states. The largely outnumbered French army crushed the Prussian army at Jena-Auerstedt in 1806; Napoleon captured Berlin and went as far as Eastern Prussia. There the Russian Empire was defeated at the Battle of Friedland (14 June 1807). Peace was dictated in the Treaties of Tilsit, in which Russia had to join the Continental System, and Prussia handed half of its territories to France. The Duchy of Warsaw was formed over these territorial losses, and Polish troops entered the Grande Armée in significant numbers.

In order to ruin the British economy, Napoleon set up the Continental System in 1807, and tried to prevent merchants across Europe from trading with British. The large amount of smuggling frustrated Napoleon, and did more harm to his economy than to his enemies'.

Freed from his obligation in the east, Napoleon then went back to the west, as the French Empire was still at war with Britain. Only two countries remained neutral in the war: Sweden and Portugal, and Napoleon then looked toward the latter. In the Treaty of Fontainebleau (1807), a Franco-Spanish alliance against Portugal was sealed as Spain eyed Portuguese territories. French armies entered Spain in order to attack Portugal, but then seized Spanish fortresses and took over the kingdom by surprise. Joseph Bonaparte, Napoleon's brother, was made King of Spain after Charles IV abdicated.

This occupation of the Iberian peninsula fueled local nationalism, and soon the Spanish and Portuguese fought the French using guerilla tactics, defeating the French forces at the Battle of Bailén (June and July 1808). Britain sent a short-lived ground support force to Portugal, and French forces evacuated Portugal as defined in the Convention of Sintra following the Allied victory at Vimeiro (21 August 1808). France only controlled Catalonia and Navarre and could have been definitely expelled from the Iberian peninsula had the Spanish armies attacked again, but the Spanish did not.

Another French attack was launched on Spain, led by Napoleon himself, and was described as "an avalanche of fire and steel". However, the French Empire was no longer regarded as invincible by European powers. In 1808, Austria formed the War of the Fifth Coalition in order to break down the French Empire. The Austrian Empire defeated the French at Aspern-Essling, yet was beaten at Wagram while the Polish allies defeated the Austrian Empire at Raszyn (April 1809). Although not as decisive as the previous Austrian defeats, the peace treaty in October 1809 stripped Austria of a large amount of territory, reducing it even more.

In 1812, war broke out with Russia, engaging Napoleon in the disastrous French invasion of Russia (1812). Napoleon assembled the largest army Europe had ever seen, including troops from all subject states, to invade Russia, which had just left the continental system and was gathering an army on the Polish frontier. Following an exhausting march and the bloody but inconclusive Battle of Borodino, near Moscow, the Grande Armée entered and captured Moscow, only to find it burning as part of the Russian scorched earth tactics. Although there still were battles, the Napoleonic army left Russia in late 1812 annihilated, most of all by the Russian winter, exhaustion, and scorched earth warfare. On the Spanish front the French troops were defeated at Vitoria (June 1813) and then at the Battle of the Pyrenees (July–August 1813). Since the Spanish guerrillas seemed to be uncontrollable, the French troops eventually evacuated Spain.

Since France had been defeated on these two fronts, states that had been conquered and controlled by Napoleon saw a good opportunity to strike back. The Sixth Coalition was formed under British leadership. The German states of the Confederation of the Rhine switched sides, finally opposing Napoleon. Napoleon was largely defeated in the Battle of the Nations outside Leipzig in October 1813, his forces heavily outnumbered by the Allied coalition armies and was overwhelmed by much larger armies during the Six Days Campaign (February 1814), although, the Six Days Campaign is often considered a tactical masterpiece because the allies suffered much higher casualties. Napoleon abdicated on 6 April 1814, and was exiled to Elba.

The conservative Congress of Vienna reversed the political changes that had occurred during the wars. Napoleon suddenly returned, seized control of France, raised an army, and marched on his enemies in the Hundred Days. It ended with his final defeat at the Battle of Waterloo in 1815, and his exile to St. Helena, a remote island in the South Atlantic Ocean.

The monarchy was subsequently restored and Louis XVIII, Younger brother of Louis XVI became king, and the exiles returned. However many of the Revolutionary and Napoleonic reforms were kept in place.

Napoleon's impact on France 
Napoleon centralized power in Paris, with all the provinces governed by all-powerful prefects whom he selected.

Religion had been a major issue during the Revolution, and Napoleon resolved most of the outstanding problems. Thereby he moved the clergy and large numbers of devout Catholics from hostility to the government to support for him. The Catholic system was reestablished by the Concordat of 1801 (signed with Pope Pius VII), so that church life returned to normal; the church lands were not restored, but the Jesuits were allowed back in and the bitter fights between the government and Church ended. Protestant, Jews and atheists were tolerated.

The French taxation system had collapsed in the 1780s. In the 1790s the government seized and sold church lands and lands of exiles aristocrats. Napoleon instituted a modern, efficient tax system that guaranteed a steady flow of revenues and made long-term financing possible.

Napoleon kept the system of conscription that had been created in the 1790s, so that every young man served in the army, which could be rapidly expanded even as it was based on a core of careerists and talented officers. Before the Revolution the aristocracy formed the officer corps. Now promotion was by merit and achievement—every private carried a marshal's baton, it was said.

The modern era of French education began in the 1790s. The Revolution in the 1790s abolished the traditional universities. Napoleon sought to replace them with new institutions, the École Polytechnique, focused on technology. The elementary schools received little attention.

Napoleonic Code 
Of permanent importance was the Napoleonic Code created by eminent jurists under Napoleon's supervision. Praised for its  clarity, it spread rapidly throughout Europe and the world in general, and marked the end of feudalism and the liberation of serfs where it took effect. The Code recognized the principles of civil liberty, equality before the law, and the secular character of the state. It discarded the old right of primogeniture (where only the eldest son inherited) and required that inheritances be divided equally among all the children. The court system was standardized; all judges were appointed by the national government in Paris.

Long 19th century, 1815–1914 

The century after the fall of Napoleon I was politically unstable:

France was no longer the dominant power it had been before 1814, but it played a major role in European economics, culture, diplomacy and military affairs. The Bourbons were restored, but left a weak record and one branch was overthrown in 1830 and the other branch in 1848 as Napoleon's nephew was elected president. He made himself emperor as Napoleon III, but was overthrown when he was defeated and captured by Prussians in an 1870 war that humiliated France and made the new nation of Germany dominant in the continent. The Third Republic was established, but the possibility of a return to monarchy remained into the 1880s. The French built up an empire, especially in Africa and Indochina. The economy was strong, with a good railway system. The arrival of the Rothschild banking family of France in 1812 guaranteed the role of Paris alongside London as a major center of international finance.

Permanent changes in French society 
The French Revolution and Napoleonic eras brought a series of major changes to France which the Bourbon restoration did not reverse. First of all, France became highly centralized, with all decisions made in Paris. The political geography was completely reorganized and made uniform. France was divided into 80+ departments, which have endured into the 21st century. Each department had the identical administrative structure, and was tightly controlled by a prefect appointed by Paris. The complex multiple overlapping legal jurisdictions of the old regime had all been abolished, and there was now one standardized legal code, administered by judges appointed by Paris, and supported by police under national control. Education was centralized, with the Grand Master of the University of France controlling every element of the entire educational system from Paris. Newly technical universities were opened in Paris which to this day have a critical role in training the elite.

Conservatism was bitterly split into the old aristocracy that returned, and the new elites that arose after 1796. The old aristocracy was eager to regain its land but felt no loyalty to the new regime. The new elite – the  – ridiculed the other group as an outdated remnant of a discredited regime that had led the nation to disaster. Both groups shared a fear of social disorder, but the level of distrust as well as the cultural differences were too great and the monarchy too inconsistent in its policies for political cooperation to be possible.

The old aristocracy had returned, and recovered much of the land they owned directly. However they completely lost all their old seigneurial rights to the rest of the farmland, and the peasants no longer were under their control. The old aristocracy had dallied with the ideas of the Enlightenment and rationalism. Now the aristocracy was much more conservative, and much more supportive of the Catholic Church. For the best jobs meritocracy was the new policy, and aristocrats had to compete directly with the growing business and professional class. Anti-clerical sentiment became much stronger than ever before, but was now based in certain elements of the middle class and indeed the peasantry as well.

In France, as in most of Europe, the sum total of wealth was concentrated. The richest 10 percent of families owned between 80 and 90 percent of the wealth from 1810 to 1914. Their share then fell to about 60 percent, where it remained into the 21st century. The share of the top one percent of the population grew from 45 percent in 1810 to 60 percent in 1914, then fell steadily to 20 percent in 1970 to the present.

The "200 families" controlled much of the nation's wealth after 1815. The "200" is based on the policy that of the 40,000 shareholders of the Bank of France, only 200 were allowed to attend the annual meeting and they cast all the votes. Out of a nation of 27 million people, only 80,000 to 90,000 were allowed to vote in 1820, and the richest one-fourth of them had two votes.

The great masses of the French people were peasants in the countryside, or impoverished workers in the cities. They gained new rights, and a new sense of possibilities. Although relieved of many of the old burdens, controls, and taxes, the peasantry was still highly traditional in its social and economic behavior. Many eagerly took on mortgages to buy as much land as possible for their children, so debt was an important factor in their calculations. The working class in the cities was a small element, and had been freed of many restrictions imposed by medieval guilds. However France was very slow to industrialize (in the sense of large factories using modern machinery), and much of the work remained drudgery without machinery or technology to help. This provided a good basis for small-scale expensive luxury crafts that attracted an international upscale market. France was still localized, especially in terms of language, but now there was an emerging French nationalism that showed its national pride in the Army, and foreign affairs.

Religion 

The Catholic Church lost all its lands and buildings during the Revolution, and these were sold off or came under the control of local governments. The bishop still ruled his diocese (which was aligned with the new department boundaries), but could only communicate with the pope through the government in Paris. Bishops, priests, nuns and other religious people were paid salaries by the state. All the old religious rites and ceremonies were retained, and the government maintained the religious buildings. The Church was allowed to operate its own seminaries and to some extent local schools as well, although this became a central political issue into the 20th century. Bishops were much less powerful than before, and had no political voice. However, the Catholic Church reinvented itself and put a new emphasis on personal religiosity that gave it a hold on the psychology of the faithful.

France remained basically Catholic. The 1872 census counted 36 million people, of whom 35.4 million were listed as Catholics, 600,000 as Protestants, 50,000 as Jews and 80,000 as freethinkers. The Revolution failed to destroy the Catholic Church, and Napoleon's concordat of 1801 restored its status. The return of the Bourbons in 1814 brought back many rich nobles and landowners who supported the Church, seeing it as a bastion of conservatism and monarchism. However the monasteries with their vast land holdings and political power were gone; much of the land had been sold to urban entrepreneurs who lacked historic connections to the land and the peasants.

Few new priests were trained in the 1790–1814 period, and many left the church. The result was that the number of parish clergy plunged from 60,000 in 1790 to 25,000 in 1815, many of them elderly. Entire regions, especially around Paris, were left with few priests. On the other hand, some traditional regions held fast to the faith, led by local nobles and historic families.

The comeback was very slow in the larger cities and industrial areas. With systematic missionary work and a new emphasis on liturgy and devotions to the Virgin Mary, plus support from Napoleon III, there was a comeback. In 1870, there were 56,500 priests, representing a much younger and more dynamic force in the villages and towns, with a thick network of schools, charities and lay organizations. Conservative Catholics held control of the national government from 1820 to 1830, but most often played secondary political roles or had to fight the assault from republicans, liberals, socialists and seculars.

Economy 

French economic history since its late-18th century Revolution was tied to three major events and trends: the Napoleonic Era, the competition with Britain and its other neighbors in regards to industrialization, and the 'total wars' of the late 19th and early 20th centuries. Quantitative analysis of output data shows the French per capita growth rates were slightly smaller than Britain. However the British population tripled in size, while France grew by only a third—so the overall British economy grew much faster. The ups and downs of French per capita economic growth in 1815–1913:
 1815–1840: irregular, but sometimes fast growth
 1840–1860: fast growth
 1860–1882: slowing down
 1882–1896: stagnation
 1896–1913: fast growth

For the 1870–1913 era, the growth rates for 12 similar advanced countries – 10 in Europe plus the United States and Canada – show that in terms of per capita growth, France was about average. However its population growth was very slow, so as far as the growth rate in total size of the economy France was in next to the last place, just ahead of Italy. The 12 countries averaged 2.7% per year in total output, but France only averaged 1.6%.

Bourbon restoration (1814–1830) 

This period of time is called the Bourbon Restoration and was marked by conflicts between reactionary Ultra-royalists, who wanted to restore the pre-1789 system of absolute monarchy, and liberals, who wanted to strengthen constitutional monarchy. Louis XVIII was the younger brother of Louis XVI, and reigned from 1814 to 1824. On becoming king, Louis issued a constitution known as the Charter which preserved many of the liberties won during the French Revolution and provided for a parliament composed of an elected Chamber of Deputies and a Chamber of Peers that was nominated by the king.

Evaluation 
After two decades of war and revolution, the restoration brought peace and quiet, and general prosperity. "Frenchmen were, on the whole, well governed, prosperous, contented during the 15-year period; one historian even describes the restoration era as 'one of the happiest periods in [France's] history'."

France had recovered from the strain and disorganization, the wars, the killings, and the horrors of two decades of disruption. It was at peace throughout the period. It paid a large war indemnity to the winners, but managed to finance that without distress; the occupation soldiers left peacefully. Population increased by 3 million, and prosperity was strong from 1815 to 1825, with the depression of 1825 caused by bad harvests. The national credit was strong, there was significant increase in public wealth, and the national budget showed a surplus every year. In the private sector, banking grew dramatically, making Paris a world center for finance, along with London. The Rothschild family was world-famous, with the French branch led by James Mayer de Rothschild (1792–1868). The communication system was improved, as roads were upgraded, canals were lengthened, and steamboat traffic became common. Industrialization was delayed in comparison to Britain and Belgium. The railway system had yet to make an appearance. Industry was heavily protected with tariffs, so there was little demand for entrepreneurship or innovation.

Culture flourished with the new romantic impulses. Oratory was highly regarded, and debates were very high standard. Châteaubriand and Madame de Staël (1766–1817) enjoyed Europe-wide reputations for their innovations in romantic literature. De Staël made important contributions to political sociology, and the sociology of literature. History flourished; François Guizot, Benjamin Constant and Madame de Staël drew lessons from the past to guide the future. The paintings of Eugène Delacroix set the standards for romantic art. Music, theater, science, and philosophy all flourished. The higher learning flourished at the Sorbonne. Major new institutions gave France world leadership in numerous advanced fields, as typified by the École Nationale des Chartes (1821) for historiography, the École Centrale des Arts et Manufactures in 1829 for innovative engineering; and the École des Beaux-Arts for the fine arts, reestablished in 1830.

Overall, the Bourbon government's handling of foreign affairs was successful. France kept a low profile, and Europe forgot its animosities. Louis and Charles had little interest in foreign affairs, so France played only minor roles. Its army helped restore the Spanish monarch in 1823. It helped the other powers deal with Greece and Turkey. King Charles X, an ultra-reactionary, mistakenly thought that foreign glory would cover domestic frustration, so he made an all-out effort to conquer Algiers in 1830. He sent a massive force of 38,000 soldiers and 4500 horses carried by 103 warships and 469 merchant ships. The expedition was a dramatic military success in only three weeks. The invasion paid for itself with 48 million francs from the captured treasury. The episode launched the second French colonial empire, but it did not provide desperately needed political support for the King at home. Charles X repeatedly exacerbated internal tensions, and tried to neutralize his enemies with repressive measures. He depended too heavily upon his inept chief minister Polignac. Repression failed and a quick sudden revolution forced Charles into exile for the third time.

July Monarchy (1830–1848) 

Protest against the absolute monarchy was in the air. The elections of deputies to 16 May 1830 had gone very badly for King Charles X. In response, he tried repression but that only aggravated the crisis as suppressed deputies, gagged journalists, students from the University and many working men of Paris poured into the streets and erected barricades during the "three glorious days" of 26–29 July 1830. Charles X was deposed and replaced by King Louis-Philippe in the July Revolution. It is traditionally regarded as a rising of the bourgeoisie against the absolute monarchy of the Bourbons. Participants in the July Revolution included the Marquis de Lafayette. Working behind the scenes on behalf of the bourgeois propertied interests was Louis Adolphe Thiers.

Louis-Philippe's "July Monarchy" (1830–1848) was dominated by the "high bourgeoisie" of bankers, financiers, industrialists and merchants.

During the reign of the July Monarchy, the Romantic Era was starting to bloom. Driven by the Romantic Era, an atmosphere of protest and revolt was all around in France. On 22 November 1831 in Lyon (the second largest city in France) the silk workers revolted and took over the town hall in protest of recent salary reductions and working conditions. This was one of the first instances of a free workers' revolt in the entire world.

Because of the constant threats to the throne, the July Monarchy began to rule with a stronger and stronger hand. Soon political meetings were outlawed. However, "banquets" were still legal and all through 1847, there was a nationwide campaign of republican banquets demanding more democracy. The climactic banquet was scheduled for 22 February 1848 in Paris but the government banned it. In response citizens of all classes poured out onto the streets of Paris in a revolt against the July Monarchy. Demands were made for abdication of "Citizen King" Louis-Philippe and for establishment of a representative democracy in France. The king abdicated, and the French Second Republic was proclaimed. Alphonse Marie Louis de Lamartine, who had been a leader of the moderate republicans in France during the 1840s, became the Minister of Foreign Affairs and in effect the premier in the new Provisional government. In reality Lamartine was the virtual head of government in 1848.

Second Republic (1848–1852) 

Frustration among the laboring classes arose when the Constituent Assembly did not address the concerns of the workers. Strikes and worker demonstrations became more common as the workers gave vent to these frustrations. These demonstrations reached a climax when on 15 May 1848, workers from the secret societies broke out in armed uprising against the anti-labor and anti-democratic policies being pursued by the Constituent Assembly and the Provisional Government. Fearful of a total breakdown of law and order, the Provisional Government invited General Louis Eugene Cavaignac back from Algeria, in June 1848, to put down the workers' armed revolt. From June 1848 until December 1848 General Cavaignac became head of the executive of the Provisional Government.

On 10 December 1848, Louis Napoleon Bonaparte was elected president by a landslide. His support came from a wide section of the French public. Various classes of French society voted for Louis Napoleon for very different and often contradictory reasons. Louis Napoleon himself encouraged this contradiction by "being all things to all people". One of his major promises to the peasantry and other groups was that there would be no new taxes.

The new National Constituent Assembly was heavily composed of royalist sympathizers of both the Legitimist (Bourbon) wing and the Orleanist (Citizen King Louis Philippe) wing. Because of the ambiguity surrounding Louis Napoleon's political positions, his agenda as president was very much in doubt. For prime minister, he selected Odilon Barrot, an unobjectionable middle-road parliamentarian who had led the "loyal opposition" under Louis Philippe. Other appointees represented various royalist factions.

The Pope had been forced out of Rome as part of the Revolutions of 1848, and Louis Napoleon sent a 14,000-man expeditionary force of troops to the Papal State under General Nicolas Charles Victor Oudinot to restore him. In late April 1849, it was defeated and pushed back from Rome by Giuseppe Garibaldi's volunteer corps, but then it recovered and recaptured Rome.

In June 1849, demonstrations against the government broke out and were suppressed. The leaders, including prominent politicians, were arrested. The government banned several democratic and socialist newspapers in France; the editors were arrested. Karl Marx was at risk, so in August he moved to London.

The government sought ways to balance its budget and reduce its debts. Toward this end, Hippolyte Passy was appointed Finance Minister. When the Legislative Assembly met at the beginning of October 1849, Passy proposed an income tax to help balance the finances of France. The bourgeoisie, who would pay most of the tax, protested. The furor over the income tax caused the resignation of Barrot as prime minister, but a new wine tax also caused protests.

The 1850 elections resulted in a conservative body. It passed the Falloux Laws, putting education into the hands of the Catholic clergy. It opened an era of cooperation between Church and state that lasted until the Jules Ferry laws reversed course in 1879. The Falloux Laws provided universal primary schooling in France and expanded opportunities for secondary schooling. In practice, the curricula were similar in Catholic and state schools. Catholic schools were especially useful in schooling for girls, which had long been neglected. Although a new electoral law was passed that respected the principle of universal (male) suffrage, the stricter residential requirement of the new law actually had the effect of disenfranchising 3,000,000 of 10,000,000 voters.

Second Empire, 1852–1870 
The president rejected the constitution and made himself emperor as Napoleon III. He is known for working to modernize the French economy, the rebuilding of Paris, expanding the overseas empire, and engaging in numerous wars. His effort to build an empire in Mexico was a fiasco. Autocratic at first, he opened the political system somewhat in the 1860s. He lost all his allies and recklessly declared war on a much more powerful Prussia in 1870; he was captured and deposed.

As 1851 opened, Louis Napoleon was not allowed by the Constitution of 1848 to seek re-election as President of France. He proclaimed himself Emperor of the French in 1852, with almost dictatorial powers. He made completion of a good railway system a high priority. He consolidated three dozen small, incomplete lines into six major companies using Paris as a hub. Paris grew dramatically in terms of population, industry, finance, commercial activity, and tourism. Napoleon working with Georges-Eugène Haussmann spent lavishly to rebuild the city into a world-class showpiece. The financial soundness for all six companies was solidified by government guarantees. Although France had started late, by 1870 it had an excellent railway system, supported as well by good roads, canals and ports.

Despite his promises in 1852 of a peaceful reign, the Emperor could not resist the temptations of glory in foreign affairs. He was visionary, mysterious and secretive; he had a poor staff, and kept running afoul of his domestic supporters. In the end he was incompetent as a diplomat. Napoleon did have some successes: he strengthened French control over Algeria, established bases in Africa, began the takeover of Indochina, and opened trade with China. He facilitated a French company building the Suez Canal, which Britain could not stop. In Europe, however, Napoleon failed again and again. The Crimean War of 1854–1856 produced no gains. Napoleon had long been an admirer of Italy and wanted to see it unified, although that might create a rival power. He plotted with Cavour of the Italian kingdom of Piedmont to expel Austria and set up an Italian confederation of four new states headed by the pope. Events in 1859 ran out of his control. Austria was quickly defeated, but instead of four new states a popular uprising united all of Italy under Piedmont. The pope held onto Rome only because Napoleon sent troops to protect him. His reward was the County of Nice (which included the city of Nice and the rugged Alpine territory to its north and east) and the Duchy of Savoy. He angered Catholics when the pope lost most of his domains. Napoleon then reversed himself and angered both the anticlerical liberals at home and his erstwhile Italian allies when he protected the pope in Rome.

The British grew annoyed at Napoleon's humanitarian intervention in Syria in 1860–1861. Napoleon lowered the tariffs, which helped in the long run but in the short run angered owners of large estates and the textile and iron industrialists, while leading worried workers to organize. Matters grew worse in the 1860s as Napoleon nearly blundered into war with the United States in 1862, while his takeover of Mexico in 1861–1867 was a total disaster. The puppet emperor he put on the Mexican throne was overthrown and executed. Finally in the end he went to war with the Germans in 1870 when it was too late to stop German unification. Napoleon had alienated everyone; after failing to obtain an alliance with Austria and Italy, France had no allies and was bitterly divided at home. It was disastrously defeated on the battlefield, losing Alsace and Lorraine. Historian A. J. P. Taylor was blunt: "he ruined France as a great power".

Foreign wars 
In 1854, the Second Empire joined the Crimean War, which saw France and Britain opposed to the Russian Empire, which was decisively defeated at Sevastopol in 1854–55 and at Inkerman in 1854. In 1856, France joined the Second Opium War on the British side against China; a missionary's murder was used as a pretext to take interests in southwest Asia in the Treaty of Tientsin.

When France was negotiating with the Netherlands about purchasing Luxembourg in 1867, the Prussian Kingdom threatened the French government with war. This "Luxembourg Crisis" came as a shock to French diplomats as there had been an agreement between the Prussian and French governments about Luxembourg. Napoleon III suffered stronger and stronger criticism from Republicans like Jules Favre, and his position seemed more fragile with the passage of time.

The country interfered in Korea in 1866 taking, once again, missionaries' murders as a pretext. The French finally withdrew from the war with little gain but war's booty. The next year a French expedition to Japan was formed to help the Tokugawa shogunate to modernize its army. However, Tokugawa was defeated during the Boshin War at the Battle of Toba–Fushimi by large Imperial armies.

Franco-Prussian War (1870–71) 

Rising tensions in 1869 about the possible candidacy of Prince Leopold von Hohenzollern-Sigmaringen to the throne of Spain caused a rise in the scale of animosity between France and Germany. Prince Leopold was a part of the Prussian royal family. He had been asked by the Spanish Cortes to accept the vacant throne of Spain.

Such an event was more than France could possibly accept. Relations between France and Germany deteriorated, and finally the Franco-Prussian War (1870–71) broke out. German nationalism united the German states, with the exception of Austria, against Napoleon III. The French Empire was defeated decisively at Metz and Sedan. Napoleon III surrendered himself and 100,000 French troops to the German troops at Sedan on 1–2 September 1870.

Two days later, on 4 September 1870, Léon Gambetta proclaimed a new republic in France. Later, when Paris was encircled by German troops, Gambetta fled Paris and became the virtual dictator of the war effort which was carried on from the rural provinces. Metz remained under siege until 27 October 1870, when 173,000 French troops there finally surrendered. Surrounded, Paris was forced to surrender on 28 January 1871. The Treaty of Frankfurt allowed the newly formed German Empire to annex the provinces of Alsace and Lorraine.

Modernisation and railways (1870–1914) 

The seemingly timeless world of the French peasantry swiftly changed from 1870 to 1914. French peasants had been poor and locked into old traditions until railroads, republican schools, and universal (male) military conscription modernized rural France. The centralized government in Paris had the goal of creating a unified nation-state, so it required all students be taught standardized French. In the process, a new national identity was forged.

Railways became a national medium for the modernization of traditionalistic regions, and a leading advocate of this approach was the poet-politician Alphonse de Lamartine. In 1857, an army colonel hoped that railways might improve the lot of "populations two or three centuries behind their fellows" and eliminate "the savage instincts born of isolation and misery". Consequently, France built a centralized system that radiated from Paris (plus in the south some lines that cut east to west). This design was intended to achieve political and cultural goals rather than maximize efficiency. After some consolidation, six companies controlled monopolies of their regions, subject to close control by the government in terms of fares, finances, and even minute technical details.

The central government Corps of Bridges, Waters and Forests brought in British engineers, handled much of the construction work, and provided engineering expertise and planning, land acquisition, and construction of permanent infrastructure such as track beds, bridges and tunnels. It also subsidized militarily necessary lines along the German border. Private operating companies provided management, hired labor, laid the tracks, and built and operated stations. They purchased and maintained the rolling stock—6,000 locomotives were in operation in 1880, which averaged 51,600 passengers a year or 21,200 tons of freight. Much of the equipment was imported from Britain and therefore did not stimulate machinery makers in France.

Although starting the whole system at once was politically expedient, it delayed completion, and forced even more reliance on temporary experts brought in from Britain. Financing was also a problem. The solution was a narrow base of funding through the Rothschilds and the closed circles of the Paris Bourse, so France did not develop the same kind of national stock exchange that flourished in London and New York. The system did help modernize the parts of rural France it reached, but it did not help create local industrial centers. Critics such as Émile Zola complained that it never overcame the corruption of the political system, but rather contributed to it.

The railways probably helped the industrial revolution in France by facilitating a national market for raw materials, wines, cheeses, and imported manufactured products. Yet the goals set by the French for their railway system were moralistic, political, and military rather than economic. As a result, the freight trains were shorter and less heavily loaded than those in such rapidly industrializing nations such as Britain, Belgium or Germany. Other infrastructure needs in rural France, such as better roads and canals, were neglected because of the expense of the railways, so it seems likely that there were net negative effects in areas not served by the trains.

Third Republic and the Belle Époque: 1871–1914

Third Republic and the Paris Commune 
Following the defeat of France in the Franco-Prussian War (1870–71), German Chancellor Otto von Bismarck proposed harsh terms for peace – including the German occupation of the provinces of Alsace and Lorraine. A new French National Assembly was elected to consider the German terms for peace. Elected on 8 February 1871, this new National Assembly was composed of 650 deputies.

Sitting in Bordeaux, the French National Assembly established the Third Republic. However, 400 members of the new Assembly were monarchists. (Léon Gambetta was one of the "non-monarchist" Republicans that were elected to the new National Assembly from Paris.) On 16 February 1871, Adolphe Thiers was elected as the chief executive of the new Republic. Because of the revolutionary unrest in Paris, the centre of the Thiers government was located at Versailles.

In late 1870 to early 1871, the workers of Paris rose up in premature and unsuccessful small-scale uprisings. The National Guard within Paris had become increasingly restive and defiant of the police, the army chief of staff, and even their own National Guard commanders. Thiers immediately recognized a revolutionary situation and, on 18 March 1871, sent regular army units to take control of artillery that belonged to the National Guard of Paris. Some soldiers of the regular army units fraternized with the rebels and the revolt escalated.

The barricades went up just as in 1830 and 1848. The Paris Commune was born. Other cities in France followed the example of the Paris Commune, as in Lyon, Marseille, and Toulouse. All of the Communes outside Paris were promptly crushed by the Thiers government.

An election on 26 March 1871 in Paris produced a government based on the working class. Louis Auguste Blanqui was in prison but a majority of delegates were his followers, called "Blanquists". The minority comprised anarchists and followers of Pierre Joseph Proudhon (1809–1855); as anarchists, the "Proudhonists" were supporters of limited or no government and wanted the revolution to follow an ad hoc course with little or no planning. Analysis of arrests records indicate the typical communard was opposed to the military, the clerics, and the rural aristocrats. He saw the bourgeoisie as the enemy.

After two months the French army moved in to retake Paris, with pitched battles fought in working-class neighbourhoods. Hundreds were executed in front of the Communards' Wall, while thousands of others were marched to Versailles for trials. The number killed during the "Bloody Week" of 21–28 May 1871 was perhaps 30,000, with as many as 50,000 later executed or imprisoned; 7,000 were exiled to New Caledonia; thousands more escaped to exile. The government won approval for its actions in a national referendum with 321,000 in favor and only 54,000 opposed.

Political battles 
The Republican government next had to confront counterrevolutionaries who rejected the legacy of the 1789 Revolution. Both the Legitimists (embodied in the person of Henri, Count of Chambord, grandson of Charles X) and the Orleanist royalists rejected republicanism, which they saw as an extension of modernity and atheism, breaking with France's traditions. This conflict became increasingly sharp in 1873, when Thiers himself was censured by the National Assembly as not being "sufficiently conservative" and resigned to make way for Marshal Patrice MacMahon as the new president. Amidst the rumors of right-wing intrigue and/or coups by the Bonapartists or Bourbons in 1874, the National Assembly set about drawing up a new constitution that would be acceptable to all parties.

The new constitution provided for universal male suffrage and called for a bicameral legislature, consisting of a Senate and a Chamber of Deputies. The initial republic was in effect led by pro-royalists, but republicans (the "Radicals") and Bonapartists scrambled for power. The first election under this new constitution – held in early 1876 – resulted in a republican victory, with 363 republicans elected as opposed to 180 monarchists. However, 75 of the monarchists elected to the new Chamber of Deputies were Bonapartists.

The possibility of a coup d'état was an ever-present factor. Léon Gambetta chose moderate Armand Dufaure as premier but he failed to form a government. MacMahon next chose conservative Jules Simon. He too failed, setting the stage for the 16 May 1877 crisis, which led to the resignation of MacMahon. A restoration of the king now seemed likely, and royalists agreed on Henri, Count of Chambord, the grandson of Charles X. He insisted on the impossible demand that France abandons its republican tricolour flag and returns to the use of the royalist fleur de lys flag, which ruined the royalist cause. Its turn never came again as the Orleanist faction rallied themselves to the Republic, behind Adolphe Thiers. The new President of the Republic in 1879 was Jules Grevy. In January 1886, Georges Boulanger became Minister of War. Georges Clemanceau was instrumental in obtaining this appointment for Boulanger. This was the start of the Boulanger era and another time of threats of a coup.

The Legitimist (Bourbon) faction mostly left politics but one segment founded L'Action Française in 1898, during the Dreyfus Affair; it became an influential movement throughout the 1930s, in particular among the conservative Catholic intellectuals.

Solidarism and Radical Party 
While liberalism was individualistic and laissez-faire in Britain and the United States, in France liberalism was based instead on a solidaristic conception of society, following the theme of the French Revolution,  ("liberty, equality, fraternity"). In the Third Republic, especially between 1895 and 1914  ["solidarism"] was the guiding concept of a liberal social policy, whose chief champions were the prime ministers Leon Bourgeois (1895–96) and Pierre Waldeck-Rousseau (1899–1902).

The period from 1879 to 1914 saw power mostly in the hands of moderate republicans and "radicals"; they avoided state ownership of industry and had a middle class political base. Their main policies were governmental intervention (financed by a progressive income tax) to provide a social safety net. They opposed church schools. They expanded educational opportunities and promoted consumers' and producers' cooperatives. In terms of foreign policy they supported the League of Nations, compulsory arbitration, controlled disarmament, and economic sanctions to keep the peace.

The French welfare state expanded when it tried to followed some of Bismarck's policies, starting with relief for the poor.

Foreign policy 

French foreign policy from 1871 to 1914 showed a dramatic transformation from a humiliated power with no friends and not much of an empire in 1871, to the centerpiece of the European alliance system in 1914, with a flourishing empire that was second in size only to Great Britain. Although religion was a hotly contested matter and domestic politics, the Catholic Church made missionary work and church building a specialty in the colonies. Most French ignored foreign policy; its issues were a low priority in politics.

French foreign policy was based on a fear of Germany—whose larger size and fast-growing economy could not be matched—combined with a revanchism that demanded the return of Alsace and Lorraine. At the same time, in the midst of the Scramble for Africa, French and British interest in Africa came into conflict. The most dangerous episode was the Fashoda Incident of 1898 when French troops tried to claim an area in the Southern Sudan, and a British force purporting to be acting in the interests of the Khedive of Egypt arrived. Under heavy pressure the French withdrew securing Anglo-Egyptian control over the area. The status quo was recognised by an agreement between the two states acknowledging British control over Egypt, while France became the dominant power in Morocco, but France suffered a humiliating defeat overall.

The Suez Canal, initially built by the French, became a joint British-French project in 1875, as both saw it as vital to maintaining their influence and empires in Asia. In 1882, ongoing civil disturbances in Egypt prompted Britain to intervene, extending a hand to France. France's leading expansionist Jules Ferry was out of office, and the government allowed Britain to take effective control of Egypt.

France had colonies in Asia and looked for alliances and found in Japan a possible ally. During his visit to France, Iwakura Tomomi asked for French assistance in reforming Japan. French military missions were sent to Japan in 1872–1880, in 1884–1889 and the last one much later in 1918–1919 to help modernize the Japanese army. Conflicts between the Chinese Emperor and the French Republic over Indochina climaxed during the Sino-French War (1884–1885). Admiral Courbet destroyed the Chinese fleet anchored at Fuzhou. The treaty ending the war, put France in a protectorate over northern and central Vietnam, which it divided into Tonkin and Annam.

In an effort to isolate Germany, France went to great pains to woo Russia and Great Britain, first by means of the Franco-Russian Alliance of 1894, then the 1904 Entente Cordiale with Great Britain, and finally the Anglo-Russian Entente in 1907, which became the Triple Entente. This alliance with Britain and Russia against Germany and Austria eventually led Russia and Britain to enter World War I as France's Allies.

Dreyfus Affair 
Distrust of Germany, faith in the army, and native French anti-semitism combined to make the Dreyfus Affair (the unjust trial and condemnation of a Jewish military officer for "treason" in 1894) a political scandal of the utmost gravity. For a decade, the nation was divided between "dreyfusards" and "anti-dreyfusards", and far-right Catholic agitators inflamed the situation even when proofs of Dreyfus's innocence came to light. The writer Émile Zola published an impassioned editorial on the injustice (J'Accuse...!) and was himself condemned by the government for libel. Dreyfus was finally pardoned in 1906. The upshot was a weakening of the conservative element in politics. Moderates were deeply divided over the Dreyfus Affair, and this allowed the Radicals to hold power from 1899 until World War I. During this period, crises like the threatened "Boulangist" coup d'état (1889) showed the fragility of the republic.

Religion 1870–1924 

Throughout the lifetime of the Third Republic there were battles over the status of the Catholic Church. The French clergy and bishops were closely associated with the Monarchists and many of its hierarchy were from noble families. Republicans were based in the anticlerical middle class who saw the Church's alliance with the monarchists as a political threat to republicanism, and a threat to the modern spirit of progress. The Republicans detested the church for its political and class affiliations; for them, the church represented outmoded traditions, superstition and monarchism. The Republicans were strengthened by Protestant and Jewish support. Numerous laws were passed to weaken the Catholic Church. In 1879, priests were excluded from the administrative committees of hospitals and of boards of charity. In 1880, new measures were directed against the religious congregations. From 1880 to 1890 came the substitution of lay women for nuns in many hospitals. Napoleon's 1801 Concordat continued in operation but in 1881, the government cut off salaries to priests it disliked.

The 1882 school laws of Republican Jules Ferry set up a national system of public schools that taught strict puritanical morality but no religion. For a while privately funded Catholic schools were tolerated. Civil marriage became compulsory, divorce was introduced and chaplains were removed from the army.

When Leo XIII became pope in 1878 he tried to calm Church-State relations. In 1884, he told French bishops not to act in a hostile manner to the State. In 1892, he issued an encyclical advising French Catholics to rally to the Republic and defend the Church by participating in Republican politics. This attempt at improving the relationship failed.

Deep-rooted suspicions remained on both sides and were inflamed by the Dreyfus Affair. Catholics were for the most part anti-dreyfusard. The Assumptionists published anti-Semitic and anti-republican articles in their journal La Croix. This infuriated Republican politicians, who were eager to take revenge. Often they worked in alliance with Masonic lodges. The Waldeck-Rousseau Ministry (1899–1902) and the Combes Ministry (1902–1905) fought with the Vatican over the appointment of bishops. Chaplains were removed from naval and military hospitals (1903–04), and soldiers were ordered not to frequent Catholic clubs (1904). Combes as Prime Minister in 1902, was determined to thoroughly defeat Catholicism. He closed down all parochial schools in France. Then he had parliament reject authorisation of all religious orders. This meant that all 54 orders were dissolved and about 20,000 members immediately left France, many for Spain.

In 1905 the 1801 Concordat was abrogated; Church and state were separated. All Church property was confiscated. Public worship was given over to associations of Catholic laymen who controlled access to churches. In practice, Masses and rituals continued. The Church was badly hurt and lost half its priests. In the long run, however, it gained autonomy—for the State no longer had a voice in choosing bishops and Gallicanism was dead. Conservative Catholics regained control of Parliament in 1919 and reversed most of the penalties imposed on the Church, and gave bishops back control of Church lands and buildings. The new pope was eager to assist the changes, and diplomatic relations were restored with the Vatican. However, the long-term secularization of French society continued, as most people only attended ceremonies for such major events as birth, marriage and funerals.

The end of the 19th and the beginning of the 20th century was referred to as the  because of peace, prosperity and the cultural innovations of Monet, Bernhardt, and Debussy, and popular amusements – cabaret, can-can, the cinema, and new art movements such as Impressionism and Art Nouveau.

In 1889, the  showed off newly modernised Paris to the world, which could look over it all from atop the new Eiffel Tower. Meant to last only a few decades, the tower was never removed and became France's most iconic landmark.

France was nevertheless a nation divided internally on notions of ideology, religion, class, regionalisms, and money. On the international front, France came repeatedly to the brink of war with the other imperial powers, such as the 1898 Fashoda Incident with Great Britain over East Africa.

Colonial empire 

The second colonial empire constituted the overseas colonies, protectorates and mandate territories that came under French rule from the 16th century onward. A distinction is generally made between the "first colonial empire", that existed until 1814, by which time most of it had been lost, and the "second colonial empire", which began with the conquest of Algiers in 1830. The second colonial empire came to an end after the loss in later wars of Vietnam (1954) and Algeria (1962), and relatively peaceful decolonizations elsewhere after 1960.

France lost wars to Britain that stripped away nearly all of its colonies by 1765. France rebuilt a new empire mostly after 1850, concentrating chiefly in Africa as well as Indochina and the South Pacific. Republicans, at first hostile to empire, only became supportive when Germany after 1880 started to build their own colonial empire. As it developed, the new empire took on roles of trade with France, especially supplying raw materials and purchasing manufactured items as well as lending prestige to the motherland and spreading French civilization and language and the Catholic religion. It also provided manpower in the World Wars.

It became a moral mission to lift the world up to French standards by bringing Christianity and French culture. In 1884, the leading proponent of colonialism, Jules Ferry, declared; "The higher races have a right over the lower races, they have a duty to civilize the inferior races." Full citizenship rights – assimilation – were offered. In reality the French settlers were given full rights and the natives given very limited rights. Apart from Algeria few settlers permanently settled in its colonies. Even in Algeria, the "Pied-Noir" (French settlers) always remained a small minority.

At its apex, it was one of the largest empires in history. Including metropolitan France, the total amount of land under French sovereignty reached  in 1920, with a population of 110 million people in 1939. In World War II, the Free French used the overseas colonies as bases from which they fought to liberate France. "In an effort to restore its world-power status after the humiliation of defeat and occupation, France was eager to maintain its overseas empire at the end of the Second World War." However, after 1945 anti-colonial movements successfully challenged European authority. The French Constitution of 27 October 1946 (Fourth Republic), established the French Union which endured until 1958. Newer remnants of the colonial empire were integrated into France as overseas departments and territories within the French Republic. These now total about 1% of the pre-1939 colonial area, with 2.7 million people living in them in 2013. By the 1970s, the last "vestiges of empire held little interest for the French. ... Except for the traumatic decolonization of Algeria, however, what is remarkable is how few long-lasting effects on France the giving up of empire entailed."

1914–1945

Population trends 

The population held steady from 40.7 million in 1911, to 41.5 million in 1936. The sense that the population was too small, especially in regard to the rapid growth of more powerful Germany, was a common theme in the early twentieth century. Natalist policies were proposed in the 1930s, and implemented in the 1940s.

France experienced a baby boom after 1945; it reversed a long-term record of low birth rates. In addition, there was a steady immigration, especially from former French colonies in North Africa. The population grew from 41 million in 1946, to 50 million in 1966, and 60 million by 1990. The farming population declined sharply, from 35% of the workforce in 1945 to under 5% by 2000. By 2004, France had the second highest birthrate in Europe, behind only Ireland.

World War I 

France did not expect war in 1914, but when it came in August the entire nation rallied enthusiastically for two years. It specialized in sending infantry forward again and again, only to be stopped again and again by German artillery, trenches, barbed wire and machine guns, with horrific casualty rates. Despite the loss of major industrial districts France produced an enormous output of munitions that armed both the French and the American armies. By 1917 the infantry was on the verge of mutiny, with a widespread sense that it was now the American turn to storm the German lines. But they rallied and defeated the greatest German offensive, which came in spring 1918, then rolled over the collapsing invaders. November 1918 brought a surge of pride and unity, and an unrestrained demand for revenge.

Preoccupied with internal problems, France paid little attention to foreign policy in the 1911–14 period, although it did extend military service to three years from two over strong Socialist objections in 1913. The rapidly escalating Balkan crisis of 1914 caught France unaware, and it played only a small role in the coming of World War I. The Serbian crisis triggered a complex set of military alliances between European states, causing most of the continent, including France, to be drawn into war within a few short weeks. Austria-Hungary declared war on Serbia in late July, triggering Russian mobilization. On 1 August both Germany and France ordered mobilization. Germany was much better prepared militarily than any of the other countries involved, including France. The German Empire, as an ally of Austria, declared war on Russia. France was allied with Russia and so was ready to commit to war against the German Empire. On 3 August Germany declared war on France, and sent its armies through neutral Belgium. Britain entered the war on 4 August, and started sending in troops on 7 August. Italy, although tied to Germany, remained neutral and then joined the Allies in 1915.

Germany's "Schlieffen Plan" was to quickly defeat the French. They captured Brussels, Belgium by 20 August and soon had captured a large portion of northern France. The original plan was to continue southwest and attack Paris from the west. By early September they were within  of Paris, and the French government had relocated to Bordeaux. The Allies finally stopped the advance northeast of Paris at the Marne River (5–12 September 1914).

The war now became a stalemate – the famous "Western Front" was fought largely in France and was characterized by very little movement despite extremely large and violent battles, often with new and more destructive military technology. On the Western Front, the small improvised trenches of the first few months rapidly grew deeper and more complex, gradually becoming vast areas of interlocking defensive works. The land war quickly became dominated by the muddy, bloody stalemate of Trench warfare, a form of war in which both opposing armies had static lines of defense. The war of movement quickly turned into a war of position. Neither side advanced much, but both sides suffered hundreds of thousands of casualties. German and Allied armies produced essentially a matched pair of trench lines from the Swiss border in the south to the North Sea coast of Belgium. Meanwhile, large swaths of northeastern France came under the brutal control of German occupiers.

Trench warfare prevailed on the Western Front from September 1914 until March 1918. Famous battles in France include Battle of Verdun (spanning 10 months from 21 February to 18 December 1916), Battle of the Somme (1 July to 18 November 1916), and five separate conflicts called the Battle of Ypres (from 1914 to 1918).

After Socialist leader Jean Jaurès, a pacifist, was assassinated at the start of the war, the French socialist movement abandoned its antimilitarist positions and joined the national war effort. Prime Minister René Viviani called for unity—for a "Union sacrée" ("Sacred Union")--Which was a wartime truce between the right and left factions that had been fighting bitterly. France had few dissenters. However, war-weariness was a major factor by 1917, even reaching the army. The soldiers were reluctant to attack; Mutiny was a factor as soldiers said it was best to wait for the arrival of millions of Americans. The soldiers were protesting not just the futility of frontal assaults in the face of German machine guns but also degraded conditions at the front lines and at home, especially infrequent leaves, poor food, the use of African and Asian colonials on the home front, and concerns about the welfare of their wives and children.

After defeating Russia in 1917, Germany now could concentrate on the Western Front, and planned an all-out assault in the spring of 1918, but had to do it before the very rapidly growing American army played a role. In March 1918 Germany launched its offensive and by May had reached the Marne and was again close to Paris. However, in the Second Battle of the Marne (15 July to 6 August 1918), the Allied line held. The Allies then shifted to the offensive. The Germans, out of reinforcements, were overwhelmed day after day and the high command saw it was hopeless. Austria and Turkey collapsed, and the Kaiser's government fell. Germany signed "The Armistice" that ended the fighting effective 11 November 1918, "the eleventh hour of the eleventh day of the eleventh month."

Wartime losses 
The war was fought in large part on French soil, with 3.4 million French dead including civilians, and four times as many military casualties. The economy was hurt by the German invasion of major industrial areas in the northeast. While the occupied area in 1913 contained only 14% of France's industrial workers, it produced 58% of the steel, and 40% of the coal. In 1914, the government implemented a war economy with controls and rationing. By 1915 the war economy went into high gear, as millions of French women and colonial men replaced the civilian roles of many of the 3 million soldiers. Considerable assistance came with the influx of American food, money and raw materials in 1917. This war economy would have important reverberations after the war, as it would be a first breach of liberal theories of non-interventionism. The damages caused by the war amounted to about 113% of the GDP of 1913, chiefly the destruction of productive capital and housing. The national debt rose from 66% of GDP in 1913 to 170% in 1919, reflecting the heavy use of bond issues to pay for the war. Inflation was severe, with the franc losing over half its value against the British pound.

The richest families were hurt, as the top 1 percent saw their share of wealth drop from about 60% in 1914 to 36% in 1935, then plunge to 20 percent in 1970 to the present. A great deal of physical and financial damage was done during the world wars, foreign investments were cashed in to pay for the wars, the Russian Bolsheviks expropriated large-scale investments, postwar inflation demolished cash holdings, stocks and bonds plunged during the Great Depression, and progressive taxes ate away at accumulated wealth.

Postwar settlement 

Peace terms were imposed by the Big Four, meeting in Paris in 1919: David Lloyd George of Britain, Vittorio Orlando of Italy, Georges Clemenceau of France, and Woodrow Wilson of the United States. Clemenceau demanded the harshest terms and won most of them in the Treaty of Versailles in 1919. Germany was forced to admit its guilt for starting the war, and was permanently weakened militarily. Germany had to pay huge sums in war reparations to the Allies (who in turn had large loans from the U.S. to pay off).

France regained Alsace-Lorraine and occupied the German industrial Saar Basin, a coal and steel region. The German African colonies were put under League of Nations mandates, and were administered by France and other victors. From the remains of the Ottoman Empire, France acquired the Mandate of Syria and the Mandate of Lebanon. French Marshal Ferdinand Foch wanted a peace that would never allow Germany to be a threat to France again, but after the Treaty of Versailles was signed he said, "This is not a peace. It is an armistice for 20 years."

Interwar years: Foreign policy and Great Depression 

France was part of the Allied force that occupied the Rhineland following the Armistice. Foch supported Poland in the Greater Poland Uprising and in the Polish–Soviet War and France also joined Spain during the Rif War. From 1925 until his death in 1932, Aristide Briand, as Prime Minister during five short intervals, directed French foreign policy, using his diplomatic skills and sense of timing to forge friendly relations with Weimar Germany as the basis of a genuine peace within the framework of the League of Nations. He realized France could neither contain the much larger Germany by itself nor secure effective support from Britain or the League.

As a response to the failure of the Weimar Republic to pay reparations in the aftermath of World War I, France occupied the industrial region of the Ruhr as a means of ensuring repayments from Germany. The intervention was a failure, and France accepted the American solution to the reparations issues, as expressed in the Dawes Plan and the Young Plan.

In the 1920s, France established an elaborate system of border defences called the Maginot Line, designed to fight off any German attack. The Line did not extend into Belgium, which Germany would exploit in 1940. Military alliances were signed with weak powers in 1920–21, called the "Little Entente".

The Great Depression affected France a bit later than other countries, hitting around 1931. While the GDP in the 1920s grew at the very strong rate of 4.43% per year, the 1930s rate fell to only 0.63%. The depression was relatively mild: unemployment peaked under 5%, the fall in production was at most 20% below the 1929 output; there was no banking crisis.

By contrast to the mild economic upheaval, the political upheaval was enormous. Socialist Leon Blum, leading the Popular Front, brought together Socialists and Radicals to become Prime Minister from 1936 to 1937; he was the first Jew and the first Socialist to lead France. The Communists in the Chamber of Deputies voted to keep the government in power, and generally supported the government's economic policies, but rejected its foreign policies. The Popular Front passed numerous labor reforms, which increased wages, cut working hours to 40 hours with overtime illegal and provided many lesser benefits to the working class such as mandatory two-week paid vacations. However, renewed inflation canceled the gains in wage rates, unemployment did not fall, and economic recovery was very slow. The Popular Front failed in economics, foreign policy, and long-term stability: "Disappointment and failure was the legacy of the Popular Front." At first the Popular Front created enormous excitement and expectations on the left—including very large scale sitdown strikes—but in the end it failed to live up to its promise. However, Socialists would later take inspiration from the attempts of the Popular Front to set up a welfare state.

The government joined Britain in establishing an arms embargo during the Spanish Civil War (1936–1939). Blum rejected support for the Spanish Republicans because of his fear that civil war might spread to deeply-divided France. Financial support in military cooperation with Poland was also a policy. The government nationalized arms suppliers, and dramatically increased its program of rearming the French military in a last-minute catch up with the Germans.

Appeasement of Germany, in cooperation with Britain, was the policy after 1936, as France sought peace even in the face of Hitler's escalating demands. Prime Minister Édouard Daladier refused to go to war against Germany and Italy without British support as Neville Chamberlain wanted to save peace at Munich in 1938.

World War II 

Germany's invasion of Poland in 1939 finally caused France and Britain to declare war against Germany. But the Allies did not launch massive assaults and instead kept a defensive stance: this was called the Phoney War in Britain or Drôle de guerre — the funny sort of war — in France. It did not prevent the German army from conquering Poland in a matter of weeks with its innovative Blitzkrieg tactics, also helped by the Soviet Union's attack on Poland.

When Germany had its hands free for an attack in the west, the Battle of France began in May 1940, and the same Blitzkrieg tactics proved just as devastating there. The Wehrmacht bypassed the Maginot Line by marching through the Ardennes forest. A second German force was sent into Belgium and the Netherlands to act as a diversion to this main thrust. In six weeks of savage fighting the French lost 90,000 men.

Many civilians sought refuge by taking to the roads of France: some 2 million refugees from Belgium and the Netherlands were joined by between 8 and 10 million French civilians, representing a quarter of the French population, all heading south and west. This movement may well have been the largest single movement of civilians in history prior to the Partition of India in 1947.

Paris fell to the Germans on 14 June 1940, but not before the British Expeditionary Force was evacuated from Dunkirk, along with many French soldiers.

Vichy France was established on 10 July 1940 to govern the unoccupied part of France and its colonies. It was led by Philippe Pétain, the aging war hero of the First World War. Petain's representatives signed a harsh Armistice on 22 June 1940 whereby Germany kept most of the French army in camps in Germany, and France had to pay out large sums in gold and food supplies. Germany occupied three-fifths of France's territory, leaving the rest in the southeast to the new Vichy government. However, in practice, most local government was handled by the traditional French officialdom. In November 1942 all of Vichy France was finally occupied by German forces. Vichy continued in existence but it was closely supervised by the Germans.

The Vichy regime sought to collaborate with Germany, keeping peace in France to avoid further occupation although at the expense of personal freedom and individual safety. Some 76,000 Jews were deported during the German occupation, often with the help of the Vichy authorities, and murdered in the Nazis' extermination camps.

Women in Vichy France 

The 2 million French soldiers held as POWs and forced laborers in Germany throughout the war were not at risk of death in combat, but the anxieties of separation for their 800,000 wives were high. The government provided a modest allowance, but one in ten became prostitutes to support their families. It gave women a key symbolic role to carry out the national regeneration. It used propaganda, women's organizations, and legislation to promote maternity, patriotic duty, and female submission to marriage, home, and children's education. Conditions were very difficult for housewives, as food was short as well as most necessities. Divorce laws were made much more stringent, and restrictions were placed on the employment of married women. Family allowances that had begun in the 1930s were continued, and became a vital lifeline for many families; it was a monthly cash bonus for having more children. In 1942, the birth rate started to rise, and by 1945 it was higher than it had been for a century.

Resistance 
General Charles de Gaulle in London declared himself on BBC radio to be the head of a rival government in exile, and gathered the Free French Forces around him, finding support in some French colonies and recognition from Britain but not the United States. After the Attack on Mers-el-Kébir in 1940, where the British fleet destroyed a large part of the French navy, still under command of Vichy France, that killed about 1,100 sailors, there was nationwide indignation and a feeling of distrust in the French forces, leading to the events of the Battle of Dakar. Eventually, several important French ships joined the Free French Forces. The United States maintained diplomatic relations with Vichy and avoided recognition of de Gaulle's claim to be the one and only government of France. Churchill, caught between the U.S. and de Gaulle, tried to find a compromise.

Within France proper, the organized underground grew as the Vichy regime resorted to more strident policies in order to fulfill the enormous demands of the Nazis and the eventual decline of Nazi Germany became more obvious. They formed the Resistance. The most famous figure of the French resistance was Jean Moulin, sent in France by de Gaulle in order to link all resistance movements; he was captured and tortured by Klaus Barbie (the "butcher of Lyon"). Increasing repression culminated in the complete destruction and extermination of the village of Oradour-sur-Glane at the height of the Battle of Normandy. At 2.15 p.m. on the afternoon of 10 June 1944, a company of the 2nd SS Panzer Division, 'Das Reich', entered Oradour-sur-Glane. They herded most of its population into barns, garages and the church, and then massacred 642 men, women and children, all of whom were civilians.

In 1953, 21 men went on trial in Bordeaux for the Oradour killings. Fourteen of the accused proved to be French citizens of Alsace. Following convictions, all but one were pardoned by the French government.

On 6 June 1944 the Allies landed in Normandy (without a French component); on 15 August Allied forces landing in Provence, this time they included 260,000 men of the French First Army. The German lines finally broke, and they fled back to Germany while keeping control of the major ports. Allied forces liberated France and the Free French were given the honor of liberating Paris in late August 1944. The French army recruited French Forces of the Interior (de Gaulle's formal name for resistance fighters) to continue the war until the final defeat of Germany; this army numbered 300,000 men by September 1944 and 370,000 by spring 1945.

The Vichy regime disintegrated. An interim Provisional Government of the French Republic was quickly put into place by de Gaulle. The gouvernement provisoire de la République française, or GPRF, operated under a tripartisme alliance of communists, socialists, and democratic republicans. The GPRF governed France from 1944 to 1946, when it was replaced by the French Fourth Republic. Tens of thousands of collaborators were executed without trial. The new government declared the Vichy laws unconstitutional and illegal, and elected new local governments. Women gained the right to vote.

Since 1945 

The political scene in 1944–45 was controlled by the Resistance, but it had numerous factions. Charles de Gaulle and the Free France element had been based outside France, but now came to dominate, in alliance with the Socialists, the Christian Democrats (MRP), and what remained of the Radical party. The Communists had largely dominated the Resistance inside France, but cooperated closely with the government in 1944–45, on orders from the Kremlin. There was a general consensus that important powers that had been an open collaboration with the Germans should be nationalized, such as Renault automobiles and the major newspapers. A new Social Security system was called for, as well as important new concessions to the labor unions. Unions themselves were divided among communist, Socialist, and Christian Democrat factions. Frustrated by his inability to control all the dominant forces, de Gaulle resigned early in 1946. On 13 October 1946, a new constitution established the Fourth Republic. The Fourth Republic consisted of a parliamentary government controlled by a series of coalitions. France attempted to regain control of French Indochina but was defeated by the Viet Minh in 1954. Only months later, France faced another anti-colonialist conflict in Algeria and the debate over whether or not to keep control of Algeria, then home to over one million European settlers, wracked the country and nearly led to a coup and civil war. Charles de Gaulle managed to keep the country together while taking steps to end the war. The Algerian War was concluded with the Évian Accords in 1962 that led to Algerian independence.

Economic recovery 
Wartime damage to the economy was severe, and apart from gold reserves, France had inadequate resources to recover on its own. The transportation system was in total shambles — the Allies had bombed out the railways and the bridges, and the Germans had destroyed the port facilities. Energy was in extremely short supply, with very low stocks of coal and oil. Imports of raw material were largely cut off, so most factories had shut down. The invaders had stripped most of the valuable industrial tools for German factories. Discussions with the United States for emergency aid dragged on, with repeated postponements on both sides. Meanwhile, several million French prisoners of war and forced laborers were being returned home, with few jobs and little food available for them. The plan was for 20 percent of German reparations to be paid to France, but Germany was in much worse shape even in France, and in no position to pay.

After de Gaulle left office in January 1946, the diplomatic logjam was broken in terms of American aid. The U.S. Army shipped in food, from 1944 to 1946, and U.S. Treasury loans and cash grants were disbursed from 1945 until 1947, with Marshall Plan aid continuing until 1951. France received additional aid form 1951-55 in order to help the country rearm and prosecute its war in Indochina. Apart from low-interest loans, the other funds were grants that did not involve repayment. The debts left over from World War I, whose payment had been suspended since 1931, was renegotiated in the Blum-Byrnes agreement of 1946. The United States forgave all $2.8 billion in debt from the First World War, and gave France a new loan of $650 million. In return French negotiator Jean Monnet set out the French five-year plan for recovery and development. The Marshall Plan gave France $2.3 billion with no repayment. The total of all American grants and credits to France from 1946 to 1953, amounted to $4.9 billion.

A central feature of the Marshall Plan was to encourage international trade, reduce tariffs, lower barriers, and modernize French management. The Marshall Plan set up intensive tours of American industry. France sent 500 missions with 4700 businessmen and experts to tour American factories, farms, stores and offices. They were especially impressed with the prosperity of American workers, and how they could purchase an inexpensive new automobile for nine months work, compared to 30 months in France. Some French businesses resisted Americanization, but the most profitable, especially chemicals, oil, electronics, and instrumentation, seized upon the opportunity to attract American investments and build a larger market. The U.S. insisted on opportunities for Hollywood films, and the French film industry responded with new life.

Although the economic situation in France was grim in 1945, resources did exist and the economy regained normal growth by the 1950s. France managed to regain its international status thanks to a successful production strategy, a demographic spurt, and technical and political innovations. Conditions varied from firm to firm. Some had been destroyed or damaged, nationalized or requisitioned, but the majority carried on, sometimes working harder and more efficiently than before the war. Industries were reorganized on a basis that ranged from consensual (electricity) to conflictual (machine tools), therefore producing uneven results. Despite strong American pressure through the ERP, there was little change in the organization and content of the training for French industrial managers. This was mainly due to the reticence of the existing institutions and the struggle among different economic and political interest groups for control over efforts to improve the further training of practitioners.

The Monnet Plan provided a coherent framework for economic policy, and it was strongly supported by the Marshall Plan. It was inspired by moderate, Keynesian free-trade ideas rather than state control. Although relaunched in an original way, the French economy was about as productive as comparable West European countries.

Claude Fohlen argues that:
 in all then, France received 7000 million dollars, which were used either to finance the imports needed to get the economy off the ground again or to implement the Monnet Plan….Without the Marshall Plan, however, the economic recovery would have been a much slower process — particularly in France, where American aid provided funds for the Monnet Plan and thereby restored equilibrium in the equipment industries, which govern the recovery of consumption, and opened the way… To continuing further growth. This growth was affected by a third factor… decolonization.

Vietnam and Algeria 
Pierre Mendès France, was a Radical party leader who was Prime Minister for eight months in 1954–55, working with the support of the Socialist and Communist parties. His top priority was ending the war in Indochina, which had already cost 92,000 dead 114,000 wounded and 28,000 captured in the wake of the humiliating defeat at the Battle of Dien Bien Phu. The United States had paid most of the costs of the war, but its support inside France had collapsed. Public opinion polls showed that in February 1954, only 7% of the French people wanted to continue the fight to keep Indochina out of the hands of the Communists, led by Ho Chi Minh and his Viet Minh movement. At the Geneva Conference in July 1954 Mendès France made a deal that gave the Viet Minh control of Vietnam north of the seventeenth parallel, and allowed France to pull out all its forces. That left South Vietnam standing alone. However, the United States moved in and provided large scale financial military and economic support for South Vietnam. Mendès-France next came to an agreement with Habib Bourguiba, the nationalist leader in Tunisia, for the independence of that colony by 1956, and began discussions with the nationalist leaders in Morocco for a French withdrawal.

With over a million European residents in Algeria (the Pieds-Noirs), France refused to grant independence until the Algerian War of Independence had turned into a French political and civil crisis. Algeria was given its independence in 1962, unleashing a massive wave of immigration from the former colony back to France of both Pied-Noir and Algerians who had supported France.

Suez crisis (1956) 

In 1956, another crisis struck French colonies, this time in Egypt. The Suez Canal, having been built by the French government, belonged to the French Republic and was operated by the Compagnie universelle du canal maritime de Suez. Great Britain had bought the Egyptian share from Isma'il Pasha and was the second-largest owner of the canal before the crisis.

The Egyptian President Gamal Abdel Nasser nationalized the canal despite French and British opposition; he determined that a European response was unlikely. Great Britain and France attacked Egypt and built an alliance with Israel against Nasser. Israel attacked from the east, Britain from Cyprus and France from Algeria. Egypt, the most powerful Arab state of the time, was defeated in a mere few days. The Suez crisis caused an outcry of indignation in the entire Arab world and Saudi Arabia set an embargo on oil on France and Britain. The US President Dwight D. Eisenhower forced a ceasefire; Britain and Israel soon withdrew, leaving France alone in Egypt. Under strong international pressures, the French government ultimately evacuated its troops from Suez and largely disengaged from the Middle East.

President de Gaulle, 1958–1969 
The May 1958 seizure of power in Algiers by French army units and French settlers opposed to concessions in the face of Arab nationalist insurrection ripped apart the unstable Fourth Republic. The National Assembly brought De Gaulle back to power during the May 1958 crisis. He founded the Fifth Republic with a strengthened presidency, and he was elected in the latter role. He managed to keep France together while taking steps to end the war, much to the anger of the Pieds-Noirs (Frenchmen settled in Algeria) and the military; both had supported his return to power to maintain colonial rule. He granted independence to Algeria in 1962 and progressively to other French colonies.

Proclaiming grandeur essential to the nature of France, de Gaulle initiated his "Politics of Grandeur." He demanded complete autonomy for France in world affairs, which meant that major decisions could not be forced upon it by NATO, the European Community or anyone else. De Gaulle pursued a policy of "national independence." He vetoed Britain's entry into the Common Market, fearing it might gain too great a voice on French affairs. While not officially abandoning NATO, he withdrew from its military integrated command, fearing that the United States had too much control over NATO. He launched an independent nuclear development program that made France the fourth nuclear power. France then adopted the dissuasion du faible au fort doctrine which meant a Soviet attack on France would only bring total destruction to both sides.

He restored cordial Franco-German relations in order to create a European counterweight between the "Anglo-Saxon" (American and British) and Soviet spheres of influence. De Gaulle openly criticised the U.S. intervention in Vietnam. He was angry at American economic power, especially what his Finance minister called the "exorbitant privilege" of the U.S. dollar. He went to Canada and proclaimed "Vive le Québec libre", the catchphrase for an independent Quebec.

In May 1968, he appeared likely to lose power amidst widespread protests by students and workers, but persisted through the crisis with backing from the army. His party, denouncing radicalism, won the 1968 election with an increased majority in the Assembly. Nonetheless, de Gaulle resigned in 1969 after losing a referendum in which he proposed more decentralization. His War Memoirs became a classic of modern French literature and many French political parties and figures claim the gaullist heritage.

Economic crises: 1970s-1980s 
By the late 1960s, France's economic growth, while strong, was beginning to lose steam. A global currency crisis meant a devaluation of the Franc against the West German Mark and the U.S. Dollar in 1968, which was one of the leading factors for the social upheaval of that year. Industrial policy was used to bolster French industries.

The Trente Glorieuses era (1945–1975) ended with the worldwide 1973 oil crisis, which increased costs in energy and thus on production. Economic instability marked the Giscard d'Estaing government (1974-1981). Giscard turned to Prime Minister Raymond Barre in 1976, who advocated numerous complex, strict policies ("Barre Plans"). The first Barre plan emerged on 22 September 1976, with a priority to stop inflation. It included a three-month price freeze; a reduction in the value added tax; wage controls; salary controls; a reduction of the growth in the money supply; and increases in the income tax, automobile taxes, luxury taxes and bank rates. There were measures to restore the trade balance, and support the growth of the economy and employment. Oil imports, whose price had shot up, were limited. There was special aid to exports, and an action fund was set up to aid industries. There was increased financial aid to farmers, who were suffering from a drought, and for social security. The package was not very popular, but was pursued with vigor.

Economic troubles continued into the early years of the presidency of François Mitterrand. A recession in the early 1980s, which led to the abandonment of dirigisme in favour of a more pragmatic approach to economic intervention. Growth resumed later in the decade, only to be slowed down by the economic depression of the early 1990s, which affected the Socialist Party. Liberalisation under Jacques Chirac in the late 1990s strengthened the economy. However, after 2005 the world economy stagnated and the 2008 global crisis and its effects in both the Eurozone and France itself dogged the conservative government of Nicolas Sarkozy, who lost reelection in 2012 against Socialist Francois Hollande.

France's recent economic history has been less turbulent than in many other countries. The average income in France, after having been steady for a long time, increased elevenfold between 1700 and 1975, which constitutes a 0.9% growth rate per year, a rate which has been outdone almost every year since 1975: By the early Eighties, for instance, wages in France were on or slightly above the EEC average.

1989 to early 21st century 
After the fall of the USSR and the end of the Cold War potential menaces to mainland France appeared considerably reduced. France began reducing its nuclear capacities and conscription was abolished in 2001. In 1990, France, led by François Mitterrand, joined the short successful Gulf War against Iraq; the French participation to this war was called the Opération Daguet.

Terrorism grew worse. In 1994, Air France Flight 8969 was hijacked by terrorists; they were captured.

Conservative Jacques Chirac assumed office as president on 17 May 1995, after a campaign focused on the need to combat France's stubbornly high unemployment rate. While France continues to revere its rich history and independence, French leaders increasingly tie the future of France to the continued development of the European Union. In 1992, France ratified the Maastricht Treaty establishing the European Union. In 1999, the Euro was introduced to replace the French franc. Beyond membership in the European Union, France is also involved in many joint European projects such as Airbus, the Galileo positioning system and the Eurocorps.

The French have stood among the strongest supporters of NATO and EU policy in the Balkans to prevent genocide in former Yugoslavia. French troops joined the 1999 NATO bombing of the Federal Republic of Yugoslavia. France has also been actively involved against international terrorism. In 2002, Alliance Base, an international Counterterrorist Intelligence Center, was secretly established in Paris. The same year France contributed to the toppling of the Taliban regime in Afghanistan, but it strongly rejected the 2003 invasion of Iraq, even threatening to veto the US proposed resolution.

Jacques Chirac was reelected in 2002, mainly because his socialist rival Lionel Jospin was removed from the runoff by the right wing candidate Jean-Marie Le Pen. Chirac was especially remembered as a fierce opponent of the U.S. invasion of Iraq in 2003. Conservative Nicolas Sarkozy was elected and took office on 16 May 2007. The problem of high unemployment has yet to be resolved. Sarkozy was very actively involved in the military operation in Libya to oust the Gaddafi government in 2011.

In 2012 election for president, Socialist François Hollande defeated Sarkozy's try for reelection. Hollande advocated a growth policy in contrast to the austerity policy advocated by Germany's Angela Merkel as a way of tackling the European sovereign debt crisis. In 2014, Hollande stood with Merkel and US President Obama in imposing sanctions on Russia for its actions against Ukraine. In December 2016, Hollande announced he will not seek a re-election as president of France.

In the 2017 election for president the winner was Emmanuel Macron, the founder of a new party "La République En Marche!". It declared itself above left and right. He called parliamentary elections that brought him absolute majority of députés. He appointed a prime minister from the centre right, and ministers from both the centre left and centre right.

In the 2022 presidential election president Macron was re-elected after beating his far-right rival, Marine Le Pen, in the runoff. He was the first re-elected incumbent French president since 2002.

Sophie Meunier in 2017 ponders whether France is still relevant in world affairs:
"France does not have as much relative global clout as it used to. Decolonization… diminished France's territorial holdings and therefore its influence. Other countries acquired nuclear weapons and built up their armies. The message of "universal" values carried by French foreign policy has encountered much resistance, as other countries have developed following a different political trajectory than the one preached by France. By the 1990s, the country had become, in the words of Stanley Hoffmann, an "ordinary power, neither a basket case nor a challenger." Public opinion, especially in the United States, no longer sees France as an essential power. The last time that its foreign policy put France back in the world spotlight was at the outset of the Iraq intervention…[with] France's refusal to join the US-led coalition….In reality, however, France is still a highly relevant power in world affairs….France is a country of major military importance nowadays…., France also showed it mattered in world environmental affairs with….the Paris Agreement, a global accord to reduce carbon emissions. The election of Trump in 2016 may reinforce demands for France to step in and lead global environmental governance if the US disengages, as the new president has promised, from a variety of policies."

Muslim tensions 

At the close of the Algerian war, hundreds of thousands of Muslims, including some who had supported France (Harkis), settled permanently to France, especially to the larger cities where they lived in subsidized public housing, and suffered very high unemployment rates. In October 2005, the predominantly Arab-immigrant suburbs of Paris, Lyon, Lille, and other French cities erupted in riots by socially alienated teenagers, many of them second- or third-generation immigrants.

Schneider says:

For the next three convulsive weeks, riots spread from suburb to suburb, affecting more than three hundred towns….Nine thousand vehicles were torched, hundreds of public and commercial buildings destroyed, four thousand rioters arrested, and 125 police officers wounded.

Traditional interpretations say these race riots were spurred by radical Muslims or unemployed youth. Another view states that the riots reflected a broader problem of racism and police violence in France.

In March 2012, a Muslim radical named Mohammed Merah shot three French soldiers and four Jewish citizens, including children in Toulouse and Montauban.

In January 2015, the satirical newspaper Charlie Hebdo that had ridiculed the Islamic prophet, Muhammad, and a neighborhood Jewish grocery store came under attack from angry Muslims who had been born and raised in the Paris region. World leaders rally to Paris to show their support for free speech. Analysts agree that the episode had a profound impact on France. The New York Times summarized the ongoing debate:

So as France grieves, it is also faced with profound questions about its future: How large is the radicalized part of the country's Muslim population, the largest in Europe? How deep is the rift between France's values of secularism, of individual, sexual and religious freedom, of freedom of the press and the freedom to shock, and a growing Muslim conservatism that rejects many of these values in the name of religion?

See also 

 Annales School, historiography
 Demographics of France, For population history
 Economic history of France
 Foreign relations of France, Since the 1950s
 French colonial empire
 History of French foreign relations, To 1954
 International relations, 1648–1814
 International relations of the Great Powers (1814–1919)
 International relations (1919–1939).
 Diplomatic history of World War I
 Diplomatic history of World War II
 Cold War
 International relations since 1989
 French law
 French criminal law
 French peasants
 French Revolution
 Historiography of the French Revolution
 History of French journalism
 History of Paris
 Legal history of France
 List of French monarchs
 List of presidents of France
 List of prime ministers of France
 Military history of France
 Politics of France
 Revue d'histoire moderne et contemporaine
 Territorial evolution of France
 Timeline of French history
 Women in France

Notes

Further reading

Surveys and reference 
 
 
 
  French textbook
 
  textbook

Social, economic and cultural history 

 
 
  economic and business history
 
 
 
 
 
 
  Essays on female artists, "printer widows," women in manufacturing, women and contracts, and elite prostitution

Middle Ages 
  survey by a leader of the Annales School

Early Modern 
 
 
  historiography

Old Regime 
 
 
  social history from Annales School
 
  survey by leader of the Annales School
 
  wide-ranging history 1700–1789
  biography

Enlightenment

Revolution 
 
 
 
 
 
 
  survey of political history
  history of ideas
 
 
  biography
 
 
 
 
 
 
 
 
  hundreds of short entries
 
  short essays by scholars
  narrative

Long-term impact 
  38 short essays by leading scholars on the political values of the French Republic
 
 
 
 
 
  comparative history

Napoleon 
 
  succinct coverage of life, France and empire; little on warfare
  political biography
 
 
  maps and synthesis
  popular history stressing empire and diplomacy
 
 
  stress on military
  evaluation of major books on Napoleon & his wars
 
 
 
  biography

Restoration: 1815–1870 
 
 
 
 
 
 
  Survey of political history
 
 
 
  historiography

Third Republic: 1871–1940 
 
 
 
 
 
 
 
 
 
 
 
 
 
 
  topical approach

World War I 
  argues that the extremely high casualty rate in very first month of fighting permanently transformed France

Vichy (1940–1944)

Fourth and Fifth Republics (1944 to present)

Historiography 

 
 
  essays by scholars
 
 
  64 essays; emphasis on Annales School

Primary sources

Scholarly journals 
 French Historical Studies
 French History (journal)
 Le Mouvement social

External links 

 History of France, from Prehistory to Nowadays (in French + English translation)
 History of France, from Middle Ages to the 19th century 
 History of France: Primary Documents (English interface)